= Antonio Albizu =

Mayor of Ponce, Puerto Rico

27th Mayor of Ponce, Puerto Rico
- In office 1 January 1836 – ? 1836
- Preceded by: Antonio Toro
- Succeeded by: Juan de Dios Conde

Personal details
- Born: ca. 1776
- Died: ca. 1856

Antonio Albizu (ca. 1776 – ca. 1856) was Mayor of Ponce, Puerto Rico, from 1 January 1836 to sometime later in 1836, when Juan de Dios Conde took over the mayoral administration.

== Background ==
Antonio Albizu came to Puerto Rico from Venezuela around 1821 and settled in Ponce. He became a landowner and hacendado and owned hacienda Rita.

== Mayoral term ==
In 1836 Antonio Albizu was part of a novel establishment in Ponce: a new, permanent ayuntamiento. While Juan de Dios Conde was mayor, Antonio Albizu, together with Juan Rondón performed as "teniente alcalde". Also working closely with Albizu were Juan Pablo Aponte (regidor decano, known today as president of the municipal council), and six council members: Valentin Tricoche, Geronimo Rabassa, Pablo Manfredi, Jose Ortiz de la Renta, Fernando Matute, and Luis Font. Additional personnel at the ayuntamiento were Luciano Ortiz de la Renta, procurador del común (a sort of townspeople representative), and Javier de Solis (Council clerk). The ayuntamiento did not meet in a public building during these early beginnings, but was organized under Puerto Rico governor Miguel de la Torre to meet at the house of a notable local citizen, Domingo Arévalo.

== See also ==
- List of Puerto Ricans
- List of mayors of Ponce, Puerto Rico

Political offices
Preceded by Antonio Toro	Mayor of Ponce, Puerto Rico; 1 January 1836 – ?? 1836	Succeeded by Juan de Dios Conde
