= Juan de Dios Conde =

Mayor of Ponce, Puerto Rico

28th Mayor of Ponce, Puerto Rico
- In office ? 1836 – 31 December 1836
- Preceded by: Antonio Albizu
- Succeeded by: José Ortiz de la Renta

31st Mayor of Ponce, Puerto Rico
- In office 1 January 1839 – 31 December 1839
- Preceded by: Patricio Colón
- Succeeded by: Salvador de Vives

Personal details
- Born: ca. 1786 Guayana
- Profession: Hacendado

Juan de Dios Conde was mayor of Ponce, Puerto Rico, in 1836 and again in 1839.

== Biography ==
Conde was born in Guayana, Venezuela, around 1786. He was an hacienda owner. Around 1787, he married Felicita Alcoser, and had six children who were all born in Ponce: Juan Elias (ca. 1818), Vicente (ca. 1820), Felicita (ca. 1822), Emilia (ca. 1824), Andres (ca. 1827) and Fernando (ca. 1829).

As an hacienda owner, Conde ran the Hacienda San Isidro in 1844. In the 1850s, he was also editor of El Ponceño newspaper.

== First mayoral term (1836) ==
Conde finished off mayor Antonio Albizu's 1936 mayoral term. The first permanent ayuntamiento was established in Ponce while Conde was mayoring the city, by the Provincial Governor Miguel de la Torre. The new ayuntamiento did not meet in a public building, as it is the case now (2019), but instead met at the house of a prominent local citizen, Domingo Arévalo. Working alongside Conde were Antonio Albizu and Juan Rondón, both of whom performed as "teniente alcalde". Working closely with them were also Juan Pablo Aponte (regidor decano), and six council members: Valentin Tricoche, Geronimo Rabassa, Pablo Manfredi, Jose Ortiz de la Renta, Fernando Matute, and Luis Font. Additional personnel at the ayuntamiento were Luciano Ortiz de la Renta, procurador del común, and Javier de Solis (Council clerk).

== Second mayoral term (1839) ==
Conde was mayor of Ponce during the entire year 1839.

== Legacy ==
There is a street in Urbanización Las Delicias of Barrio Magueyes in Ponce named after him.

== See also ==
- List of mayors of Ponce, Puerto Rico
- List of Puerto Ricans

Political offices
Preceded by Julián Villodas	Mayor of Ponce, Puerto Rico; 1836-1836	Succeeded by José Ortiz de la Renta
Preceded by Patricio Colón	Mayor of Ponce, Puerto Rico; 1839-1839	Succeeded by Salvador de Vives
