= José de Jesús Fernández =

Mayor of Ponce, Puerto Rico

42nd Mayor of Ponce, Puerto Rico
- In office 1 July 1846 – 31 December 1846
- Preceded by: José Ortíz de la Renta
- Succeeded by: David Laporte

Personal details
- Born: ca. 1786
- Died: ca. 1866

José de Jesús Fernández (Note: While this name could be interpreted as First Name is "José de Jesús", and Last Name is "Fernández", Enciclopedia Puerto Rico spells the name of this mayor leaving no ambiguity that his paternal surname is "De Jesus" and his maternal surname is "Fernandez") (a.k.a. José Jesús Fernández) (ca. 1786 – ca. 1866) was Mayor of Ponce, Puerto Rico, from 1 July 1846 to 31 December 1846. He led the municipality under Spain's new Decreto Orgánico de 1846.

== Mayoral term ==
De Jesús Fernández was the first mayor in Ponce to command power under the new Decreto Orgánico de 1846 (1846 Organic Decree). Decreto Orgánico de 1846 had been approved on 8 January 1845, and enacted on 27 February 1846 and went in effect on 1 July 1846, the first day that De Jesús Fernández took office. This new Law for Municipalities allowed for increased centralization of public administration and greater political control over municipalities.

The municipal system resulting from Decreto Orgánico de 1846 produced the following local arrangement:

- Mayor: José de Jesús Fernández
- Deputy mayor: Julio Dubocq
- 1st mayor: Juan Mandry
- 2nd mayor: Flavius Dede
- 3rd mayor: Jaime Guilbee
- 4th mayor: Pablo Manfredi
- 5th mayor: Juan Van Ryhn
- 6th mayor: Mariano León
- 7th mayor: Ignacio Tirado
- 8th mayor: Carlos Vives
- 9th mayor: Jaime Piris
- 10th mayor: Ruperto Aponte
- 11th mayor: Antonio Pereyra Brandao
- 12th mayor: Irene Ortíz
- 13th mayor: José Glivau
- 1st mayor: José de la Rocha
- 2nd mayor: Antonio Albizu

== See also ==
- List of Puerto Ricans
- List of mayors of Ponce, Puerto Rico

== Notes ==
Political offices
Preceded by José Ortíz de la Renta	Mayor of Ponce, Puerto Rico; 1 July 1846 - 31 December 1846	Succeeded by David Laporte
