= José Zaldo =

Mayor of Ponce, Puerto Rico

39th Mayor of Ponce, Puerto Rico
- In office 1 December (?) 1845 – 31 December 1845
- Preceded by: Antonio Corro
- Succeeded by: Antonio Corro

Personal details
- Born: c. 1790 Ponce
- Died: c. 1855 Ponce
- Profession: Politician

José Zaldo (c. 1790 – c. 1855) was one of two interim mayors of Ponce, Puerto Rico, after the death of mayor Salvador de Vives. Antonio Corro was the first interim mayor, followed by José Zaldo, who was interim mayor until 31 December of that year. Corro then became mayor on 1 January 1846, and performed as mayor until 31 March 1846.

== See also ==
- List of Puerto Ricans
- List of mayors of Ponce, Puerto Rico

Political offices
| Preceded by Antonio Corro | Mayor of Ponce, Puerto Rico; 1 December (?) 1845 - 31 December 1845 | Succeeded by Antonio Corro |
