= Joaquín Tellechea =

Spanish Army sergeant major and mayor

17th Mayor of Ponce, Puerto Rico
- In office 1821–1821
- Preceded by: José Casimiro Ortíz de la Renta
- Succeeded by: José Casimiro Ortíz de la Renta

Personal details
- Born: ca. 1761 Ponce, Puerto Rico (Note: Ivette Perez Vega ("Las Sociedades Mercantiles de Ponce, 1816-1830", p. 298.) states he was a "ponceño" but does not actually say he was born in Ponce. So it may simply imply he was a resident of, or "vecino de", Ponce.)
- Died: ca. 1841
- Occupation: Sergeant major

Joaquín Tellechea was an hacendado and Spanish Army sergeant major who served as the 17th mayor (Note: Actas del Cabildo de Ponce: 1812-1823, by Ilia del Toro Robledo (Gobierno Municipal Autónomo de Ponce. Ponce, Puerto Rico. 1993. [Comisión Puertorriqueña para la Celebración del Quinto Centenario del Descubrimiento de America y Puerto Rico en Conmemoración del Encuentro de Dos Mundos.]) presents Tellechea, during the entirety of 1820, as an segundo alcalde, or "second mayor", a type of vice mayor or deputy mayor, serving under José Casimiro Ortiz de la Renta. See pp. 136, 139, 147, 187, and 207.) of Ponce, Puerto Rico, in 1821. Tellechea was a sergeant major and also owned a 90-cuerda sugar cane hacienda in the Los Caños sector in Ponce.

== Introduction to politics ==
Tellechea was church clerk (Secretario parroquial) at the time the first constitutional mayor and municipal council were instituted in Ponce in 1812 as a result of the Spanish Constitution of 1812. He recorded the minutes of the first municipal council meeting while a council clerk was voted on and put in place. By the end of that same council meeting, held on 18 October 1812, Tellechea was himself elected council clerk. He was confirmed at the next meeting, held on 26 October 1812, and by the following meeting (2 November 1812) he was already signing the official record of the meetings for historical preservation and archiving.

== Mayoral term ==
Tellechea is remembered because, in late 1820, he altered the elections results for the mayoral post in his favor so that he, and not the other candidate for the post —Jose Casimiro Ortiz de la Renta—would appear elected for the job. As a result, he was suspended from serving; he was not allowed to stay on even as a regular member of the municipal council. Instead, Salvador Blanch won the municipal mayor seat. Tellechea subsequently fled ("se marcho a Tierra Firme") and was never heard of again. On 16 December 1821, Blanch was finally elected mayor but, it turns out, he was not able to accept the position because of conflicts with his work as harbourmaster.

== See also ==
- List of Puerto Ricans
- List of mayors of Ponce, Puerto Rico

== Notes ==
Political offices
Preceded by José Casimiro Ortíz de la Renta	Mayor of Ponce, Puerto Rico; 1821-1821	Succeeded by José Casimiro Ortíz de la Renta
