= Patricio Colón =

Mayor of Ponce, Puerto Rico

30th Mayor of Ponce, Puerto Rico
- In office 1838–1838
- Preceded by: José Ortíz de la Renta
- Succeeded by: Juan de Dios Conde

Personal details
- Born: ca. 1793 Ponce, Puerto Rico
- Spouse: Marcelina Manfredi y Figueroa
- Profession: Hacienda owner

Patricio Colón was Mayor of the city of Ponce in 1838.

== Biography ==
Colón was born in Ponce, Puerto Rico, around 1793. In 1838 he was an hacienda owner in Barrio Vayas, and owned five slaves. He married Marcelina Manfredi y Figueroa, with whom he had five children: Angela (ca. 1810) Joseph (ca. 1820), Joseph de Jesus (ca. 1824), Carmen (ca. 1826), and Eduviges (ca. 1829).

== See also ==
- Ponce, Puerto Rico
- List of Puerto Ricans

Political offices
Preceded by José Ortíz de la Renta	Mayor of Ponce, Puerto Rico; 1838	Succeeded by Juan de Dios Conde
