= Elicio Berriz =

Puerto Rican-Spanish politician

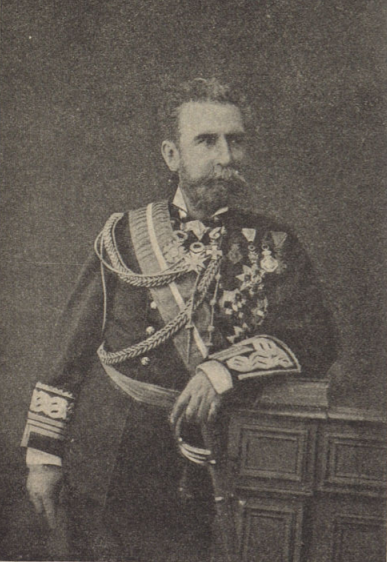
- Elicio Berriz. c. 1872

70th Mayor of Ponce, Puerto Rico
- In office 1 January 1869 – 11 May 1870
- Preceded by: Demetrio Santaella
- Succeeded by: Vicente Pérez Valdivieso

73rd Mayor of Ponce, Puerto Rico
- In office 1 January 1872 – c. 31 January 1872
- Preceded by: Miguel Arribas
- Succeeded by: Francisco Arce y Romero

Personal details
- Born: c. 1820 Spain
- Died: c. 1890
- Profession: Artillery Colonel

Elicio Berriz (Note: Historian Eduardo Neumann Gandia spells his name as "Eliseo Berriz" (p. 99) but also as "Elicio Berriz" (p. 279). See "Verdadera y Auténtica Historia de la Ciudad de Ponce", pp.99, 279.) (c. 1820 – c. 1890) was a Spanish soldier and Mayor of Ponce, Puerto Rico, from 1 January 1869 to 11 May 1870. and again from 1 January 1872 until his mayoral assignment was passed to two Ponce municipal assemblymen, Francisco Arce y Romero and Alejandro Albizu, later that year. As a Spanish Army soldier, Berriz held the rank of Artillery Colonel.

== First mayoral term (1869) ==
Berriz served as mayor from 1 January 1869 until 11 May 1870, when Vicente Pérez Valdivieso started serving as mayor. Berriz is best remembered as the military officer and mayor who, in 1869, sought the removal and destruction of the monument erected to honor the Spanish Constitution of 1812 that for many decades had been located at today's Plaza Degetau.

== Second mayoral term (1872) ==
Berriz served again as mayor from 1 January 1872 until c. 31 January 1872. when Francisco Arce y Romero started his mayoral service.

== See also ==
- List of mayors of Ponce, Puerto Rico

== Notes ==
Political offices
Preceded by Demetrio Santaella	Mayor of Ponce, Puerto Rico; 1 January 1869 - 11 May 1870	Succeeded by Vicente Pérez Valdivieso
Preceded by Miguel Arribas	Mayor of Ponce, Puerto Rico; 1 January 1872 - 31 January(?) 1872	Succeeded by Francisco Arce y Romero
