= Carlos Cabrera y Martínez =

Puerto Rican landowner, farmer and mayor (c. 1806 – c. 1886)

67th Mayor of Ponce, Puerto Rico
- In office 1 November 1866 – 19 December 1866
- Preceded by: Francisco Romero
- Succeeded by: Enrique O'Neil

Personal details
- Born: c. 1806
- Died: c. 1886
- Spouse: Panchita Paz
- Occupation: Landowner and sugar cane Farmer

Carlos Cabrera y Martínez (c. 1806 – c. 1886) was interim Mayor of Ponce, Puerto Rico, from 1 November 1866 to 19 December 1866. He was interim mayor, together with Francisco Romero, and both performed as interim corregidors until Colonel Enrique O'Neil became the appointed corregidor on 20 December 1866 for the remainder of that year and into 1867.

== Background ==
As a young man, Cabrera y Martínez liked to write poems. As an adult, he was a sugar cane hacendado farmer and was several times appointed a Diputado Provincial (Provincial Delegate) as well as other prominent positions in the Ponce society.

Cabrera y Martinez had his house at the northeast corner of Calle Cristina and Calle Marina, across from Plaza Las Delicias. His house had belonged to José Ortiz de la Renta. During the planning years for the construction of the Asilo de Damas de Ponce (Ponce Women's Shelter), founded on 9 April 1863, Cabrera Martínez lent his house for the shelter-to-be board of directors to meet and perform all the necessary planning and organizing for the construction and opening of the shelter. During these meetings they also created the Shelter Foundation's by-laws, which was later approved by the Spanish Crown on 11 November 1863. He was also an active member of the Casino de Ponce, having lent his spacious home as a headquarters for the casino in July 1876, when the society has 105 member. (Note: Casino de Ponce was located at 2 locations prior to the current (2019) location at the southeast corner of the intersection of Calle Marina and Calle Luna. It was first located on Calle Marina at the property where Rosendo Matienzo had his law office. The second was located at Carlos Cabrera's house at the northeast corner of Calle Cristina and Calle Marina streets.)

== Mayoral term ==
Cabrera y Martínez is known to have been of liberal ideas and opinions. During his mayoral term, a conference was convened in Madrid by order of the Spanish Overseas Minister, named Antonio Canovanas del Castillo, to discuss matters related to social, political, and economic issues. A representative from the ayuntamiento was to attend, and Ponce elected Luis Antonio Becerra, who didn't attend for political reasons related to slavery n Puerto Rico.

== See also ==
- List of Puerto Ricans
- List of mayors of Ponce, Puerto Rico

== Notes ==
Political offices
Preceded by Francisco Romero	Mayor of Ponce, Puerto Rico; 1 November 1866 – 19 December 1866	Succeeded by Enrique O'Neil
