= Salvador Vives =

Salvador Vives may refer to:

- Salvador de Vives, mayor of Ponce, Puerto Rico
- Salvador Vives Gómez, actor from Barcelona
