= Juan Cortada Tirado =

Puerto Rican politician

Member of the Puerto Rico Senate from the Ponce district
- In office 1917–1920

Personal details
- Born: May 24, 1864 Ponce, Puerto Rico
- Died: 1937 (aged 72–73) New York, New York
- Party: Republican Party
- Profession: Politician

Juan Enrique Cortada Tirado (1864–1937) was a Puerto Rican politician, businessman, and landowner. He served as a member of the Senate of Puerto Rico from 1917 to 1920.

== Early years and studies ==
Juan Cortada Tirado was born in 1864 to Juan Cortada y Quintana who was the 76th Mayor of Ponce, Puerto Rico and Mercedes Tirado Y Hinsch. He had a younger brother called Eduardo.

== Professional career ==
From an early age, Cortada worked at his father's estate. Some sources say that his father ceded the ownership of the Hacienda Descalabrado to him and his brother in 1871, but never registered it.

In 1887, Cortada was arrested in Santa Isabel on orders of General Romualdo Palacios for conspiring against the Spanish Government.

After his release, he and his brother assumed ownership of Hacienda Descalabrado, which then became Central Cortada. In the first years of the 20th Century, Central Cortada became the second largest sugar producer in the island.

== Political career ==
In 1917, Cortada was elected to the first Puerto Rican Senate, representing the District of Ponce for the Republican Party.

== See also ==
- Ponce, Puerto Rico
- List of Puerto Ricans
