= Antonio Corro =

Mayor of Ponce, Puerto Rico

38th Mayor of Ponce, Puerto Rico
- In office 25 November 1845 – 30 November(?) 1845
- Preceded by: Salvador de Vives
- Succeeded by: José Zaldo

40th Mayor of Ponce, Puerto Rico
- In office 1 January 1846 – 31 March 1846
- Preceded by: José Zaldo
- Succeeded by: José Ortíz de la Renta

Personal details
- Born: c. 1790
- Died: c. 1855

Antonio Corro (c. 1790 – c. 1855) was one of the two interim mayors of Ponce, Puerto Rico, after the death of mayor Salvador de Vives on 24 November 1845. Corro was interim mayor as well as José Zaldo during 1845. Corro served first, followed by Zaldo. He then also served as mayor during the first three months of 1846.

== First mayoral term ==
Corro served as interim mayor of Ponce starting on 25 November 1845 upon the death-while-in-office of Salvador de Vives, and served until around 30 November 1845 when José Zaldo took Corro's place as interim mayor.

== Second mayoral term ==
After José Zaldo had served as interim mayor until 31 December 1846, (Note: It is likely that Antonio Corro was the "official" interim mayor, while Jose Zaldo filled it as mayor while Corro was away, perhaps in extended travel most likely to the Peninsula.) Antonio Corro again became the interim mayor on 1 January 1846 and served until 31 March 1846, when José Ortíz de la Renta became mayor.

== See also ==
- List of Puerto Ricans
- List of mayors of Ponce, Puerto Rico

== Notes ==
Political offices
Preceded by Salvador de Vives	Mayor of Ponce, Puerto Rico; 25 November 1845 - 30 November(?) 1845	Succeeded by José Zaldo
Preceded by José Zaldo	Mayor of Ponce, Puerto Rico; 1 January 1846 – 31 March 1846	Succeeded by José Ortíz de la Renta
