= Antonio Toro =

Mayor of Ponce, Puerto Rico, from 1833 to 1836

26th Mayor of Ponce, Puerto Rico
- In office 1833–1836
- Preceded by: Francisco Vassallo
- Succeeded by: Antonio Albizu

Personal details
- Born: ca. 1783
- Died: ca. 1853
- Profession: Politician

Antonio Toro was Mayor of Ponce, Puerto Rico from 1833 to 1836.

== Mayoral term ==
During Toro's mayoral administration Hacienda Buena Vista was founded in Barrio Magueyes, Ponce. However, there are no Acts in the Municipality of Ponce for the period 1824 to 1834, affecting at least part of the period while Antonio Toro was mayor as well.

== See also ==
- List of Puerto Ricans
- List of mayors of Ponce, Puerto Rico

Political offices
Preceded by Francisco Vassallo	Mayor of Ponce, Puerto Rico; 1833–1836	Succeeded by Antonio Albizu
