= Manuel Cedeño de Poveda =

Mayor of Ponce, Puerto Rico

52nd Mayor of Ponce, Puerto Rico
- In office January 1851 – 23 April 1851
- Preceded by: Antonio Fortún
- Succeeded by: Guillermo Neumann

Personal details
- Born: c. 1800
- Died: c. 1860
- Profession: Politician

Manuel Cedeño de Poveda (c. 1800 – c. 1860) was Mayor of Ponce, Puerto Rico, from January 1851 to 23 April 1851. (Note: Socorro Girón states he was a "corregidor", a person chosen by the King to act as mayor.)

== See also ==
- List of Puerto Ricans
- List of mayors of Ponce, Puerto Rico

== Notes ==
Political offices
Preceded by Antonio Fortún	Mayor of Ponce, Puerto Rico; January 1851 - 23 April 1851	Succeeded by Guillermo Neumann
