= José Mirelis =

Puerto Rican politician (1830–1900)

82nd Mayor of Ponce, Puerto Rico
- In office 1 May 1880 – 31 January 1881
- Preceded by: Lucas Jiménez
- Succeeded by: Juan José Cartagena

Personal details
- Born: ca. 1830
- Died: ca. 1900 (aged ca. 70)
- Profession: Military

José Mirelis (Note: Some sources erroneously spell his name "José Mileris". Here we follow the spelling given in the original 1913 work by Eduardo Neumann Gandia (See "Verdadera y Auténtica Historia de la Ciudad de Ponce." 1913. San Juan, Puerto Rico: Instituto de Cultura Puertorriqueña. p.279.), Puerto Rico Encyclopedia (See https://web.archive.org/web/20101123162620/http://enciclopediapr.org/ing/article.cfm?ref=09012901&page=3), and Neysa Rodriguez Deynes (See Brevario Sobre la Historia de Ponce. Gobierno Municipal Autonomo de Ponce. 2002, p.167.).) (ca. 1830 – ca. 1900) was the mayor of Ponce, Puerto Rico, from 1 May 1880, to 31 January 1881. He was a Spanish soldier who held the rank of colonel.

== Mayoral term ==
During Mirelis's mayoral administration, a significant event occurred on 25 September 1880, when a fire destroyed most of the older civil records (births, baptisms, marriages, etc.) of the Ponce parish. Also, on 17 June 1880, the trainway from Ponce to La Playa was inaugurated, with public service commencing on 23 October 1880, both under the administration of mayor Mirelis.

== See also ==
- List of Puerto Ricans
- List of mayors of Ponce, Puerto Rico

== Notes ==
Political offices
Preceded by Lucas Jiménez	Mayor of Ponce, Puerto Rico; 1 May 1880 - 31 January 1881	Succeeded by Juan José Cartagena
