= Antonio Fortún =

First corregidor Mayor of Ponce, Puerto Rico

Coronel Antonio Fortún

51st Mayor of Ponce, Puerto Rico
- In office April 1850 – 8 January 1851
- Preceded by: Flavius Dede
- Succeeded by: Manuel Cedeño de Poveda

Personal details
- Born: c. 1800
- Died: c. 1860
- Profession: Military

Antonio Fortún (ca. 1800 – ca. 1860) was the first corregidor Mayor of Ponce, Puerto Rico. He was the top civil authority in the municipality of Ponce from April 1850 to 8 January 1851. He was a Spanish military officer with the rank of Coronel.

== Mayoral term ==
As corregidor, he had been named by the Spanish Crown to serve as Alcalde, but had both administrative duties and judicial powers. Fortún was he first corregidor in Ponce. It resulted from the Spanish Crown Order of 13 December 1849, which mandated Puerto Rico Provincial governor Juan de la Pezuela to institute a corregidor in Ponce. This he did via his Announcement dated 19 March 1850. In the following month (April), Antonio Fortún took over. At the time of this assignment, Fortún was the military commander of the district of Ponce.

== See also ==
- List of Puerto Ricans
- List of mayors of Ponce, Puerto Rico
- Corregimiento

== Notes ==
Political offices
Preceded by Flavius Dede	Mayor of Ponce, Puerto Rico; April 1850 - 8 January 1851	Succeeded by Manuel Cedeño de Poveda
