= Tomás de Renovales =

Puerto Rican politician

24th Mayor of Ponce, Puerto Rico
- In office 1831–1831
- Preceded by: Julián Villodas
- Succeeded by: Francisco Vassallo

Personal details
- Born: c. 1788 Arcentales, Biscay
- Died: 10 July 1844 Ponce, Puerto Rico
- Spouse: Nicolasa Garcia
- Profession: Soldier

Tomás de Renovales (c. 1788 – 10 July 1844) was a Spanish military commander for the southern region of Puerto Rico in the first half of the 19th century and de facto Mayor of the city of Ponce in 1831. He held the rank of colonel.

== Early years ==
De Renovales was born in Arcentales, Biscay, around 1788.

== Military career ==
In 1808, he was a soldier in the Spanish Army and took part in the War of Independence in Spain against the French invaders. He migrated to Puerto Rico from Venezuela circa 1825. In 1830, the Junta de Terrenos Baldíos granted him ownership of 450 cuerdas of land in Guayama's Barrio Jobos. He was military commander of Puerto Rico's 5th Department. He retired in March 1842.

== Family life ==
He married Nicolasa Garcia, with whom he had seven children. He died in Ponce on 10 July 1844 and was buried at Panteón Nacional Román Baldorioty de Castro. He was known to abuse consumption of alcohol.

== Mayoral term ==
De Renovales is best remembered as the mayor that made improvements to the lookout at Cerro El Vigia, including its telescope and flags. There are no Acts in the Municipality of Ponce for the period 1824 to 1834, affecting the period while Tomás de Renovales was mayor as well.

== Death ==
He was interred at Panteón Nacional Román Baldorioty de Castro.

== See also ==
- List of Puerto Ricans

Political offices
| Preceded by Julián Villodas | Mayor of Ponce, Puerto Rico; 1831 | Succeeded by Francisco Vassallo |
