= Vicente Pérez =

Vicente Pérez may refer to:

- Vicente Pérez (footballer)
- Vicente Pérez (motorcyclist)
- Vicente Pérez Rosales, Chilean politician and diplomat
- Vicente Pérez Valdivieso, mayor of Ponce, Puerto Rico
