= Juan Prats =

Mayor and appraiser from Puerto Rico in the 1840s

47th Mayor of Ponce, Puerto Rico
- In office 1 January 1849 – 30 June 1849
- Preceded by: José María Quesada
- Succeeded by: Esteban Vidal

49th Mayor of Ponce, Puerto Rico
- In office 1 October 1849 – 31 December 1849
- Preceded by: Esteban Vidal
- Succeeded by: Flavius Dede

Personal details
- Born: c. 1800 Catalonia, Spain
- Died: c. 1870 Ponce, Puerto Rico
- Profession: Appraiser and Hacendado

Juan Prats (ca. 1800 – ca. 1870) was Mayor of Ponce, Puerto Rico, twice in 1849. He was a landowner, owning—among others—Hacienda La Matilde, in Ponce. He was also an appraiser, best known for the contentious appraisal of the plot of land where the Ponce City Hall was built.

== Background ==
Prats was a Spaniard from Catalonia. In 1841 —eight years before he became mayor— as a result of a legal dispute brought against the municipality of Ponce by Catalina Rodriguez, granddaughter of José Rodriguez (a.k.a., "El Portugués", and after whom sources state Río Portugués is said to have been named), Prats was contracted by the Municipality to appraise a land property that Catalina Rodriguez owned and which the Municipality wanted to build on. He was a very wealthy merchant and hacendado. At the height of his wealth, he was the wealthiest man in Ponce and one of the wealthiest in Puerto Rico. In 1859 he owned three sugar haciendas in addition to his wholesale company.

== First mayoral term ==
Juan Prats was mayor of Ponce beginning on 1 January 1849 and ending on 30 June 1849, when Esteban Vidal started serving as mayor.

== Second mayoral term ==
Prats again served as mayor beginning on 1 October 1849 and ending on 31 December 1849, when Flavius Dede began his mayoral term.

== See also ==
- List of Puerto Ricans
- List of mayors of Ponce, Puerto Rico

Political offices
Preceded by José María Quesada	Mayor of Ponce, Puerto Rico; 1 May 1849 - 30 June 1849	Succeeded by Esteban Vidal
Preceded by Esteban Vidal	Mayor of Ponce, Puerto Rico; 1 October 1849 - 31 December 1849	Succeeded by Flavius Dede
