= Francisco Carreras =

Mayor of Ponce, Puerto Rico

65th Mayor of Ponce, Puerto Rico
- In office 1 January 1866 – 31 August 1866
- Preceded by: Francisco Olazarra
- Succeeded by: Francisco Romero

Personal details
- Born: ca. 1816 Ponce, Puerto Rico
- Died: ca. 1896

Francisco Carreras was Mayor of Ponce, Puerto Rico, from 1 January 1866 to 31 August 1866.

== See also ==
- List of Puerto Ricans
- List of mayors of Ponce, Puerto Rico

Political offices
Preceded by Francisco Olazarra	Mayor of Ponce, Puerto Rico; 1 January 1866 - 31 August 1866	Succeeded by Francisco Romero
