= Luis de Quixano y Font =

Puerto Rican politician

Coronel Luis de Quixano y Font

63rd Mayor of Ponce, Puerto Rico
- In office 11 July 1863 – 23 June 1865
- Preceded by: Hilarión Pérez Guerra
- Succeeded by: Francisco Olazarra

Personal details
- Born: c. 1810
- Died: c. 1880
- Profession: Military

Luis de Quixano y Font (Note: Also written "Luis de Quijano y Font" (See Eduardo Neumann Gandia. Verdadera y Autentica Historia de la Ciudad de Ponce. 1913. p. 20.)) (c. 1810 - c. 1880) was Mayor of Ponce, Puerto Rico, from 11 July 1863 to 23 June 1865.

== Background ==
Quixano Font was a retired Spanish colonel that performed as corregidor mayor of Ponce. He was also an early propeller of the celebration of the fiestas patronales in Ponce.

== Mayoral term ==
Luis de Quixano y Font is best known for building the now-historic 65-kiosk Plaza del Mercado de Ponce in 1863. Occupying a full city block, this farmers' market was modeled after the Paris farmers' market. Luis de Quixano is also credited with setting up the first lighting of the city, when he ordered the installation of 16 oil-based lampposts around Plaza Las Delicias in 1864. Upon leaving his mayoral duties in Ponce on 23 June 1865, Quixano y Font became mayor of San German.

== See also ==
- List of Puerto Ricans
- List of mayors of Ponce, Puerto Rico

== Notes ==
Political offices
Preceded by Hilarión Pérez Guerra	Mayor of Ponce, Puerto Rico; 11 July 1863 -23 June 1865	Succeeded by Francisco Olazarra
