= José María Quesada =

Mayor of Ponce, Puerto Rico

46th Mayor of Ponce, Puerto Rico
- In office 1 October 1848 – 31 December 1848
- Preceded by: Juan Lacot
- Succeeded by: Juan Prats

Personal details
- Born: ca. 1778 Spain (Note: Citing Archivo General de Puerto Rico (AGPR, Records of the Spanish Governors of Puerto Rico [formerly, Record Group # 186 at the National Archives, Washington, D.C.], Political and Civil Affairs, entry 9, box 14, "Lista...de los vecinos blancos..."), Francisco Antonio Scarano states José María Quesada was of Venezuelan nationality. (See Sugar and slavery in Puerto Rico: the municipality of Ponce, 1815-1849. Appendix A: "On the National Origin of the Hacendados." page 446. Ph. D. Thesis. Columbia University. 1978. See also Sugar and slavery in Puerto Rico: The plantation economy of Ponce, 1810-1830. Appendix A: "National Origins of the Ponce Hacendados." Table A-1: Hacendados in 1827. pp 174-175. The University of Wisconsin Press. 1984. ISBN 0299095800.))
- Died: ca. 1858
- Spouse: Maria del Rosario Perez
- Children: José María, Eustaquio, Eustaquia
- Occupation: Merchant and Hacendado

José María Quesada (ca. 1778 – ca. 1858) was Mayor of Ponce, Puerto Rico, from 1 October 1848 to 31 December 1848.

== Background ==
Quesada was a Spaniard who migrated to Puerto Rico from Venezuela in 1819, establishing himself in Ponce. His wife was Maria del Rosario Perez, and they had three children, Jose Maria (Jr.), Eustaquio and Eustaquia.

== Merchant business ==
In 1826, Quesada and his two sons formed a business corporation in Ponce and established it as a financial services company focused on money lending. On 27 February 1820 there was a fire in Ponce that destroyed almost the entire city. Over one hundred of the best residences in the city were destroyed and most of the businesses, and two-thirds of the townspeople were left homeless. Among the business losses were Jose Maria Quesada's.

== See also ==
- List of Puerto Ricans
- List of mayors of Ponce, Puerto Rico

== Notes ==
Political offices
Preceded by Juan Lacot	Mayor of Ponce, Puerto Rico; 1 October 1848- 31 December 1848	Succeeded by Juan Prats
