= Flavius Dede =

Mayor of Ponce, Puerto Rico

50th Mayor of Ponce, Puerto Rico
- In office 1 January 1850 – 31 March 1850
- Preceded by: Juan Prats
- Succeeded by: Antonio Fortún

Personal details
- Born: c. 1800 Germany
- Died: c. 1870
- Occupation: Merchant Hacendado

Flavius Dede (c. 1800 – c. 1870) was Mayor of Ponce, Puerto Rico, from 1 January 1850 to 31 March 1850.

== Background ==
Dede arrived in Ponce in 1826, presumably—according to Scarano—lured by the promising prospects of the sugar trade. As a young man, he first worked in the merchant firm of Germany's consul in Ponce, Thomas Davidson. By 1831, Dede had established his own merchant firm together with another German emigre, Ernst W. Overmann. In 1841–1842, the partnership purchased Hacienda Flacas, a large estate consisting of some 250 cuerdas of land. His association with Overmann lasted until 1865 when the civil war in the United States led to a precipitous drop in sugar trade and their hacienda went bankrupt.

== Introduction to politics ==
In 1836, Dede had been one of a team of three assistants to Barrio Playa mayor (Note: At that time, barrios had "mayors"; they were, however, not vested with legal authority and only had limited administrative authority) Sargent Rafael Muñoz. Dede also performed as "2nd mayor" under mayor José de Jesús Fernández in 1846. The position was the result of the new Decreto Orgánico de 1846 (1846 Organic Decree), a new Law for Municipalities that allowed for increased centralization of public administration and greater political control over municipalities. Despite this lack of full political control at the municipal level, the former job allowed Dede to gain administrative experience for his future work as mayor.

== See also ==
- List of Puerto Ricans
- List of mayors of Ponce, Puerto Rico

== Notes ==
Political offices
| Preceded by Juan Prats | Mayor of Ponce, Puerto Rico; 1 January 1850 – 31 March 1850 | Succeeded by Antonio Fortún |
