= Pedro Rosalí =

Puerto Rican politician

77th Mayor of Ponce, Puerto Rico
- In office 4 February 1874 – 5 May 1874
- Preceded by: Juan Cortada y Quintana
- Succeeded by: Rafael León y García

Personal details
- Born: c. 1824
- Died: c. 1894

Pedro Rosalí (c. 1824 – c. 1894) was Mayor of Ponce, Puerto Rico, from 4 February 1874 until 5 May 1874.

== See also ==
- List of Puerto Ricans
- List of mayors of Ponce, Puerto Rico

Political offices
Preceded by Juan Cortada y Quintana	Mayor of Ponce, Puerto Rico; 4 February 1874 – 5 May 1874	Succeeded by Rafael León y García
