= Serafín Donderis =

Mayor of Ponce, Puerto Rico

79th Mayor of Ponce, Puerto Rico
- In office 1875–1875
- Preceded by: Rafael León y García
- Succeeded by: Juan José Cartagena

Personal details
- Born: c. 1820
- Died: c. 1885
- Profession: Military

Serafín Donderis (c. 1820 – c. 1885) was Mayor of Ponce, Puerto Rico, in 1875. He was a Spanish military officer with the rank of Coronel.

== Mayoral term ==
On 14 February 1875, construction started on the Acueducto de Ponce at a cost of $220,000 ($6.45 million in 2025 dollars), and became operational in 1878.

== See also ==
- List of Puerto Ricans
- List of mayors of Ponce, Puerto Rico

Political offices
Preceded by Rafael León y García	Mayor of Ponce, Puerto Rico; 1875 - 1875	Succeeded by Juan José Cartagena
