= Enrique O'Neil =

Puerto Rican politician

Coronel Enrique O'Neil

68th Mayor of Ponce, Puerto Rico
- In office 1866–1867
- Preceded by: Carlos Cabrera y Martínez
- Succeeded by: Demetrio Santaella

Personal details
- Profession: Soldier

Enrique O'Neil was Mayor of Ponce, Puerto Rico, from 1866 to 1867.

== Mayoral term ==
Enrique O'Neil is best known for having adopted a complete plan for urban remodeling for the city of Ponce in 1867. The plan was adopted with the help of Spanish military engineer Félix D'Ors. It was influenced by remodeling plans in Paris, Barcelona, and Madrid. Part of the legacy of that plan are the chamfered street corners evident throughout the city. Jorge Rigau has stated that these features "signaled the city's coming of age as a modern urban entity."

== See also ==
- List of mayors of Ponce, Puerto Rico
- List of Puerto Ricans

Political offices
Preceded by Carlos Cabrera y Martínez	Mayor of Ponce, Puerto Rico; 1866–1867	Succeeded by Demetrio Santaella
