= Tomás Pérez Guerra =

Mayor of Ponce, Puerto Rico (c.1775–c.1846)

22nd Mayor of Ponce, Puerto Rico
- In office 1 January 1826 – 31 December 1826
- Preceded by: José Ortíz de la Renta
- Succeeded by: Julián Villodas

Personal details
- Born: c. 1775 Santiago de los Caballeros
- Died: ca. 1846
- Spouse: María del Carmen Miura y Pepin
- Children: Hilarión Pérez Guerra y Miura (c. 1813-1871)
- Parent(s): Luis Pérez Guerra y Tresplaciaso and Rosa Sánchez y Firpo
- Profession: Military officer

Military service
- Rank: Teniente Coronel

Tomás Pérez Guerra y Sánchez (c. 1775, Santiago de los Caballeros – ca. 1846) was Mayor of Ponce, Puerto Rico, from 1 January 1826 to 31 December 1826.

== Biography ==
Tomás Pérez Guerra y Sánchez was the son of Teniente Coronel Luis Pérez Guerra y Tresplaciaso, a native of Ruenes, Asturias, and Rosa Sánchez y Firpo. Tomás enlisted in the Militia on February 4, 1788 with the quality of being a son of a Captain at the age of 12 or 13. He was given the rank of Cadete del Batallón on June 7, 1791. In June of 1795, he requested to be stationed in the northern frontier of Hispaniola where he fought for the Spanish in the War of the Pyrenees. After the war's end in the following month, he returned to Santo Domingo. On October 31, 1810 in Santo Domingo, Subteniente Tomás married María del Carmen Miura y Pepin, the daughter of Teniente de Infantería Martín Miura and Josefa Pepin. He was noted as being a part of the militia in Puerto Rico at this time. While stationed in San Juan, Pérez Guerra was promoted to the rank of Teniente. He also owned a slave named Rafaela who had a daughter named María Ricarda in 1814. At some point, he returned to Santo Domingo serving in the militia and where he had a child in 1821 before relocating back to Puerto Rico likely as a result of the occupation of the colony of Santo Domingo by Haiti in 1822. By 1826, Pérez Guerra was in Ponce serving as mayor and a part of the militia. His son Hilarión Pérez Guerra y Miura also served as Mayor of Ponce.

== Mayoral term ==
On 31 August 1826, during the midst of mayor Pérez Guerra's mayoral term, a slave revolt in Ponce against the slave owners in Ponce was discovered and the slaves were condemned to death. The Provincial Military Governor of Puerto Rico, Miguel de la Torre, traveled to Ponce to witness the mass shooting. The 11 slaves shot dead were named as follows: Francisco José, Federico, Benito, Pablo Viejo, Oguis, José Félix (from Barrio El Quemado), Faustino (also from Barrio El Quemado), Francisco Antonio, Don Esteban Miguel Roque's Francisco Antonio and Manuel, and Don Wedestein's Inés. There are no Acts in the Municipality for the period from 1824 to 1834, affecting the period while Pérez Guerra was mayor.

== See also ==
- List of Puerto Ricans
- List of mayors of Ponce, Puerto Rico

Political offices
| Preceded by José Ortíz de la Renta | Mayor of Ponce, Puerto Rico; 1 January 1826 – 31 December 1826 | Succeeded by Julián Villodas |
