= Esteban Vidal =

Mayor of Ponce, Puerto Rico

48th Mayor of Ponce, Puerto Rico
- In office 1 July 1849 – 30 September 1849
- Preceded by: Juan Prats
- Succeeded by: Juan Prats

Personal details
- Born: c. 1800
- Died: c. 1880

Esteban Vidal (c. 1800 – c. 1880) was Mayor of Ponce, Puerto Rico, from 1 July 1849 to 30 September 1849.

== Introduction to political life ==
In 1852, Vidal was one of seven assemblymen at the Ponce Municipal Assembly.

== See also ==
- List of Puerto Ricans
- List of mayors of Ponce, Puerto Rico

Political offices
Preceded by Juan Prats	Mayor of Ponce, Puerto Rico; 1 July 1849 - 30 September 1849	Succeeded by Juan Prats
