= Dámaso de Toro =

Puerto Rican mayor

2nd Mayor of Ponce, Puerto Rico
- In office 1701–1701
- Preceded by: Pedro Sánchez de Mathos
- Succeeded by: Aurelio Juan Ramírez de Arellano

Personal details
- Born: c. 1645
- Died: c. 1713
- Occupation: Teniente a guerra
- Profession: Military

Dámaso de Toro was mayor of Ponce, Puerto Rico, in 1701.

== Mayoral term ==
In 1701 the Rebellion of San German took place. The Rebellion was a conflict between the Captaincy General of Puerto Rico and the residents of San Germán, Coamo, Ponce, Aguada and other poblados in the western region of Puerto Rico that, at the time, were politically dependent on San Germán. The rebellion arose as a result of the governor ordering Juan Torres Figueroa, sargento mayor of Ponce at the time, to ready 100 men to march to San Juan should it be necessary during a crisis.

== Legacy ==
There is a street in Urbanización Las Delicias of Barrio Magueyes in Ponce named after him.

== See also ==
- List of Puerto Ricans
- List of mayors of Ponce, Puerto Rico

Political offices
Preceded by Pedro Sánchez de Mathos	Mayor of Ponce, Puerto Rico; 1701–1701	Succeeded by Aurelio Juan Ramírez de Arellano
