= José Mercado =

José Mercado may refer to:

- José Mercado (mayor) (1762-1842), mayor of Ponce, Puerto Rico
- José Mercado Rizal (1861-1896), Filipino nationalist, writer and polymath
- José Mercado (footballer) (1928-2017), Mexican footballer
- José Mercado (cyclist) (1938-2013), Mexican cyclist
- José Refugio Mercado Díaz (1942-2014), Mexican Roman Catholic Bishop
