= Lucas Jiménez =

Puerto Rican politician (1829–1909)

81st Mayor of Ponce, Puerto Rico
- In office 4 July 1879 – 30 April 1880
- Preceded by: Juan José Cartagena
- Succeeded by: José Mirelis

Personal details
- Born: ca. 1829
- Died: ca. 1909
- Profession: Military

Lucas Jiménez was the mayor of Ponce, Puerto Rico, from 4 July 1879, to 30 April 1880. He was a Spanish soldier with the rank of colonel.

== See also ==
- List of Puerto Ricans
- List of mayors of Ponce, Puerto Rico

Political offices
Preceded by Juan José Cartagena	Mayor of Ponce, Puerto Rico; 4 July 1879 - 30 April 1880	Succeeded by José Mirelis
