= Francisco Olazarra =

Mayor of Ponce, Puerto Rico

64th Mayor of Ponce, Puerto Rico
- In office 23 June 1865 – 31 December 1865
- Preceded by: Luis de Quixano y Font
- Succeeded by: Francisco Carreras

Personal details
- Born: ca. 1805
- Died: ca. 1885
- Profession: Military (Lieutenant)

Francisco Olazarra (c. 1805 – c. 1885) was a corregidor Mayor of Ponce, Puerto Rico, from 23 June 1865 to 31 December 1865

== Background ==
Olazarra (full name: Francisco Olazarra y Sanchez) was lieutenant of the Primera División in the Regimento de Extremadura (Extremadura Regiment) and had been wounded during the Battle of Bilbao. As lieutenant, he reported to Captain Matias Escay.

He was named corregidor Mayor of Ponce by Puerto Rico's Lieutenant General Félix María de Messina Iglesias on 5 June 1865, proclaimed on 10 June of that year, and started his commission on 23 June. His appointment was the result of Luis Quixano y Font being moved to Aguadilla to serve as corregidor mayor there, thus leaving vacant the post in Ponce.

== Mayoral term ==
Olazarra is best remembered as the mayor who ordered an investigation into the case of a slave woman named Agripina, who belonged to slave owner Pablo Niuri. Both Olazarra and municipal council member Capo took part in carrying out the investigation, which took place between October and November 1865. On 10 October 1865, the slave was returned to Niuri, her owner while the investigation was allowed to proceed, and Olazarra wrote to Niuri "once you take delivery of the slave, you are to keep her available to this city hall for whenever she is asked for, and expecting you to apply no punishment on her, as there is no grounds for punishing her while she makes a credible petition for her freedom if there are grounds to believe the law is on her side." Despite her attempts, the slave woman 's request was denied. She was returned to her owner and later managed to flee her owner anyway.

== See also ==
- List of Puerto Ricans
- List of mayors of Ponce, Puerto Rico

Political offices
Preceded by Luis de Quixano y Font	Mayor of Ponce, Puerto Rico; 23 June 1865 – 31 December 1865	Succeeded by Francisco Carreras
