= José Casimiro Ortíz de la Renta =

Mayor of Ponce, Puerto Rico

16th Mayor of Ponce, Puerto Rico
- In office 1 January 1821 – ? 1821
- Preceded by: José Ortíz de la Renta
- Succeeded by: Joaquín Tellechea

18th Mayor of Ponce, Puerto Rico
- In office ? 1821 – 31 December 1821
- Preceded by: Joaquín Tellechea
- Succeeded by: José Molina

Personal details
- Born: ca. 1760 Majorca, Spain
- Died: ca. 1830 Ponce, Puerto Rico
- Profession: Military

José Casimiro Ortíz de la Renta (ca. 1760 – ca. 1830) was Mayor of Ponce, Puerto Rico, during two short periods in 1821.

== Background ==
José Casimiro Ortíz de la Renta was a descendant of the founder of San Germán, on the hills of Santa Marta, next to Río Guanajibo, in 1573. Ortíz de la Renta is best remembered as the Sargento Mayor (Sergeant major) who, with two companies totaling 293 men, provided guard for the defenses of the city of Ponce during the April 1797 British attack on San Juan.

== First mayoral term (January 1821) ==
José Casimiro Ortíz de la Renta was mayor of Ponce starting on 1 January 1821 and until Joaquín Tellechea took over as mayor. During his first mayoral term, Ortiz de la Renta performed as an alcalde constitucional.

== Second mayoral term (1821) ==
José Casimiro Ortíz de la Renta's second (and last) mayoral term in Ponce started upon mayor Joaquín Tellechea's resigning from mayor and lasted until 31 December 1821, at which point mayor José Molina was appointed mayor starting on 1 January 1822. During his second mayoral term, Ortiz de la Renta performed, again, as alcalde constitucional.

== See also ==
- List of Puerto Ricans
- List of mayors of Ponce, Puerto Rico

Political offices
Preceded by José Ortíz de la Renta	Mayor of Ponce, Puerto Rico; 1 January 1821 - 1821	Succeeded by Joaquín Tellechea
Preceded by Joaquín Tellechea	Mayor of Ponce, Puerto Rico; 1821 - 31 December 1821	Succeeded by José Molina
