= Juan Dávila =

Juan Dávila may refer to:

- Juan Dávila (politician)
- Juan Davila (artist)
- Juan Manuel Dávila, Guatemalan footballer
