= Rafael León y García =

Mayor of Ponce, Puerto Rico

78th Mayor of Ponce, Puerto Rico
- In office 1874–1875
- Preceded by: Pedro Rosalí
- Succeeded by: Serafín Donderis

Personal details
- Born: c. 1814
- Died: c. 1885
- Profession: politician

Rafael León y García, a.k.a., Rafael de León (c. 1814 – c. 1885), was mayor of Ponce, Puerto Rico, from 1874 to 1875.

== Mayoral term ==
León y García is remembered for various accomplishments during his short stay as Mayor of Ponce. He is remembered for issuing, in 1874, a circular describing the urgent need to conserve Puerto Rico’s forests to avoid ruining the island's agriculture. Only 9700 hectares (23,969 acres) of heavily timbered forest remained in the Luquillo Forest at the time. Closer to his hometown of Ponce, he is also remembered for spearheading, on 20 May 1874, the project that would eventually result in the construction of the Acueducto de Ponce.

== See also ==
- List of Puerto Ricans
- List of mayors of Ponce, Puerto Rico

Political offices
Preceded by Pedro Rosalí	Mayor of Ponce, Puerto Rico; 1874-1875	Succeeded by Serafín Donderis
