= Alejandro Ordóñez =

19th-century Spanish mayor of Ponce, Puerto Rico

10th Mayor of Ponce, Puerto Rico
- In office 3 January 1816 – 31 December 1818
- Preceded by: José Ortiz de la Renta
- Succeeded by: Juan Dávila

Personal details
- Born: ca. 1766
- Died: ca. 1836
- Relations: Ana Maria Ordoñez (sister)
- Profession: Army lieutenant

Alejandro Ordóñez (c. 1766 – c. 1836) was Mayor of Ponce, Puerto Rico, from 3 January 1816 to 31 December 1818. He was a teniente justicia mayor (justice major lieutenant). (Note: While Eduardo Neumann Gandia (1913) calls him "teniente justicia mayor" (justice major lieutenant), Eli D. Oquendo Rodriguez (2016) calls him "alcalde real ordinario" (ordinary royal mayor). (See, Eli D. Oquendo Rodriguez. 1800-1885, Nuestra Señora de Guadalupe: Historia de la Parroquia de Ponce durante el Siglo XIX. Centro de Estudios e Investigaciones del Sur Oeste (CEISO). Lajas, Puerto Rico: Editorial Akelarre. 2016. ISBN 9781523888702. p. 178.) It is worth noticing, however, that an older source yet, the actual Municipal Act for 26 October 1817, registers Ordoñez as "teniente del ejercito, comandante militar y alcalde ordinario" (army lieutenant, military commander and ordinary mayor). In any event, here we use Neumann Gandia as the most authoritative source, as well as to maintain consistency with the characterization of other mayors, as Neumann Gandia is the only author that provides a listing of such characterizations that includes all mayors.)

== Background ==
Ordóñez was a Spanish subject who had arrived to Puerto Rico from Venezuela with his family, plenty of cash, and merchandise and slaves. He was educated, knowledgeable on matters of business and agriculture, and with plans to grow a prosperous business. He arrived in Puerto Rico on 1815 as a Comandante Militar y Político (Military Commander and Politician) and was immediately named Subdelegado Real de Hacienda and Teniente de Justicia Mayor in Coamo. Two years later, in 1817, he became Alcalde Ordinario in Ponce. As of 1 January 1816, heads of civil government in Ponce that up to that time were titled "teniente a guerra", began to be titled "justicia mayor". However, on 6 June of that same year, they stop titling heads of local government as "Justicia Mayor" and they start naming ordinary mayors.

== Mayoral term ==
Ordóñez is best remembered for creating the first known map of Ponce in 1818. While Ordóñez was mayor of Ponce, the municipality also ceased to depend on Coamo for governmental matters and becomes head of its own district. This meant it no longer needed to channel government matters to be heard by the Governor via administrative personnel in Coamo, but began to enjoy the benefits of a direct channel of communication with the capital.

== Post mayoral life ==
Ordóñez is also known to have been commissioned, sometime around 1825, for the planning and opening of several downtown streets, including Calle León, Calle Aurora, Calle Amor and Calle Salud.

== Legacy ==
There is a street in Urbanización Las Delicias of Barrio Magueyes in Ponce named after Ordóñez.

== See also ==
- List of Puerto Ricans
- List of mayors of Ponce, Puerto Rico

== Notes ==
Political offices
Preceded by José Ortiz de la Renta	Mayor of Ponce, Puerto Rico; 3 January 1816 – 31 December 1818	Succeeded by Juan Dávila
