= Escolástico Fuentes =

Former interim mayor of Ponce, Puerto Rico

56th Mayor of Ponce, Puerto Rico
- In office 14 February 1854 – 24 July 1854
- Preceded by: Julio Duboc
- Succeeded by: Pablo Manfredi

Personal details
- Born: c. 1800
- Died: 1860 (aged 59–60)

Escolástico Fuentes (c. 1800 – c. 1860) was one of five interim mayors of Ponce, Puerto Rico, during the period of 14 February 1854 to 24 July 1854. The other four interim mayors during that six-month period were Julio Duboc, Pablo Manfredi, José Benito Paz Falcón, and Antonio E. Molina.

== See also ==
- List of Puerto Ricans
- List of mayors of Ponce, Puerto Rico

Political offices
Preceded by Julio Duboc	Mayor of Ponce, Puerto Rico; 14 February 1854 - 24 July 1854	Succeeded by Pablo Manfredi
