= Francisco Arce (disambiguation) =

Francisco Arce (born 1971) is a Paraguayan football manager and former player.

Francisco Arce may also refer to:

- Francisco Arce y Romero (1822–1902), Corregidor Mayor of Ponce, Puerto Rico
- Francisco Arce Montes (born 1950), Spanish serial abuser and murderer
- Francisco Arce (boxer) (born 1981), Mexican boxer
