= Francisco Vassallo =

Puerto Rican mayor

12th Mayor of Ponce, Puerto Rico
- In office 1 January 1820 – ca. 2 May 1820
- Preceded by: Juan Dávila
- Succeeded by: Joaquín Martínez

25th Mayor of Ponce, Puerto Rico
- In office 1 January 1832 – 31 December 1832
- Preceded by: Tomás de Renovales
- Succeeded by: Antonio Toro

Personal details
- Born: 1789 Orihuela, Valencia, Spain.
- Died: 20 December 1849 Ponce, Puerto Rico
- Children: Francisco Vassallo Cabrera
- Occupation: Military Writer

Francisco Vassallo (Note: Some sources, such as Encyclopedia Puerto Rico (See, https://enciclopediapr.org/encyclopedia/municipio-de-ponce/#1465331383974-fc51e170-c3cd) erroneously spell Francisco Vassallo's surname "Vasallo". Here the spelling given by Eduardo Neumann Gandia's Verdadera y Autentica Historia (1913) is used.) (1789 - 20 December 1849) was Mayor of Ponce, Puerto Rico, in 1820 (ending 2 May 1820) and 1832.

== Biography ==
Vassallo y Forés had been a soldier in Spain's War of Independence, a conflict between French and Spanish forces that took place from 1807 to 1814. He had been taken prisoner of war in Nantes. He arrived in Puerto Rico in 1816. Once in Puerto Rico, he left the military and immersed himself into writing and politics. Soon after his arrival he married and had a son whom he named Francisco. In 1821 Vassallo was the military commander for Puerto Rico's southern region after Puerto Rico's governor, Brigadier General Gonzalo Arostegui y Herrera, divided the island into five commanding regions.

== First mayoral term (1820) ==
Vassallo is remembered as the mayor who orchestrated the expulsion out of Puerto Rico of Ponce resident Lorenzo Matias Ras because, after consultation with the other residents of the town, he was considered an "undesirable" person to the community.

On 27 February 1820, a large fire that "almost destroyed the early Ponce settlement" took place, prompting Governor Miguel de la Torre to order that "every male from 16 to 60 years old must become a [volunteer] firefighter". The fire destroyed 106 "of the best homes in town." Also in 1820, the first known division of the Ponce territory into barrios took place. Vassallo ordered the firing of the cannon atop Cerro del Vigía to alert the town dwellers to the fire. The fire was so devastating that 12 days later Puerto Rico governor Salvador Meléndez Bruna ordered the streets in Ponce to be widened before any rebuilding was allowed to begin.

== Second mayoral term (1832) ==
He was mayor from 1 January 1832 until 31 December 1832. Little is known about the administration of the municipality during this second (and last) mayoral term, as there are no Acts in the Municipality of Ponce for that year.

== Death and legacy ==
Vassallo Fores died in Ponce on 20 December 1849. There is a street in Urbanización Las Delicias of Barrio Magueyes in Ponce named after him.

== See also ==
- List of Puerto Ricans
- List of mayors of Ponce, Puerto Rico

== Notes ==
Political offices
Preceded by Juan Dávila	Mayor of Ponce, Puerto Rico; 1 January 1820 - 2 May 1820	Succeeded by Joaquín Martínez
Preceded by Tomás de Renovales	Mayor of Ponce, Puerto Rico; 1 January 1832 - 31 December 1832	Succeeded by Antonio Toro
