= Juan Lacot =

Mayor of the city of Ponce, Puerto Rico

45th Mayor of Ponce, Puerto Rico
- In office 1 September 1848 – 30 September 1849
- Preceded by: Francisco Romero
- Succeeded by: José María Quesada

Personal details
- Born: ca. 1816 Catalunya, Spain
- Died: 5 January 1866 Ponce, Puerto Rico
- Spouse: Matilde Martinez Caraballo
- Children: Elisa, Juan, Jose
- Profession: Merchant

Juan Lacot Feliú was Mayor of the city of Ponce from 1 September 1848 to 30 September 1849.

== Biography ==
Lacot Feliú was born in Catalunya, Spain, ca. 1816. He was a businessman in Barrio Playa in Ponce, Puerto Rico, where he also resided.

== Mayoral term ==
During the pandemic of 1855 in Puerto Rico, Lacot lent one of his homes in Barrio Playa for the lodging of residents infected with the cholera bacterium. Juan Lacot was mayor of Ponce when the town received its charter as a villa by the Spanish Crown on 29 July 1848.

== Family life ==
His wife was Matilde Martinez Caraballo and they had three children: Elisa, Juan, and Jose.

== See also ==
- List of Puerto Ricans
- List of mayors of Ponce, Puerto Rico

Political offices
Preceded by Francisco Romero	Mayor of Ponce, Puerto Rico; 1 September 1848 - 30 September 1849	Succeeded by José María Quesada
