= Miguel Arribas =

Mayor of Ponce, Puerto Rico

72nd Mayor of Ponce, Puerto Rico
- In office 28 July 1871 – 31 December 1871
- Preceded by: Vicente Pérez Valdivieso
- Succeeded by: Elicio Berriz

Personal details
- Born: c. 1811
- Died: c. 1891

Miguel Arribas (ca. 1811 – ca. 1891) was Mayor of Ponce, Puerto Rico, from 28 July 1871 to 31 December 1871.

== See also ==
- List of Puerto Ricans
- List of mayors of Ponce, Puerto Rico

Political offices
Preceded by Vicente Pérez Valdivieso	Mayor of Ponce, Puerto Rico; 28 July 1871 – 31 December 1871	Succeeded by Elicio Berriz
