= José Molina =

José Molina is the name of:

- José Angel Molina (born 1958), Puerto Rican retired boxer
- José Francisco Molina (born 1970), Spanish former professional football goalkeeper
- José Luis Molina (born 1965), Costa Rican long-distance runner
- José Molina (baseball) (born 1975), Puerto Rican professional baseball manager and former catcher
- José Molina (mayor) (c. 1782–c. 1862), aka José Molinas, mayor of Ponce, Puerto Rico in 1822
- Jose Molina (writer) (born 1971), Puerto Rican television producer, screenwriter, and podcaster
