= Joaquín Martínez (mayor) =

Mayor of Ponce, Puerto Rico

13th Mayor of Ponce, Puerto Rico
- In office c. 2 May 1820 – c. 3 June 1820
- Preceded by: Francisco Vassallo
- Succeeded by: José de Toro

Personal details
- Born: c. 1760
- Died: c. 1840
- Occupation: Military commander

Joaquín Martínez (c. 1760 – c. 1840) was Mayor of Ponce, Puerto Rico, from circa 2 May 1820 to circa 3 June 1820.

== Mayoral term ==
Martínez is best remembered as the mayor who on 24 May 1820 reinstated into their respective jobs the municipal employees who had been laid off since 1814. Records show their names were Josef del Toro, Antonio Algarra, Juan Bautista Villafañe, Felipe Collazo, Carlos de Lugo, Jacinto de Torres, Juan Pablo Aponte Ramos, Jose Luciano Ortiz, and Vicente Sanchez. Within 10 days, however, on 3 June 1820, he was being replaced by a new mayor, José de Toro.

On 27 February 1820, a large fire that "almost destroyed the early Ponce settlement" took place, prompting Governor Miguel de la Torre to order that "every male from 16 to 60 years old must become a [volunteer] firefighter". The fire destroyed 106 "of the best homes in town."

Also in 1820, the first known division of the Ponce territory into barrios takes place.

== See also ==
- List of mayors of Ponce, Puerto Rico
- List of Puerto Ricans

Political offices
Preceded by Francisco Vassallo	Mayor of Ponce, Puerto Rico; 2 May 1820 - 3 June 1820	Succeeded by José de Toro
