= José de Toro =

Mayor of Ponce, Puerto Rico

8th Mayor of Ponce, Puerto Rico
- In office 1814–1814
- Preceded by: José Ortiz de la Renta
- Succeeded by: José Ortiz de la Renta

14th Mayor of Ponce, Puerto Rico
- In office 3 June 1820 – 1820
- Preceded by: Joaquín Martínez
- Succeeded by: José Ortiz de la Renta

Personal details
- Born: ca. 1764
- Died: ca. 1840
- Occupation: Army captain
- Profession: Teniente a guerra

José de Toro (Note: Some sources spell his name "José del Toro". See, for example, Mariano Vidal Armstrong's "Ponce: Notas Para su Historia." Second Edition. 1986. p. 79.) was Mayor of Ponce, Puerto Rico, in two (Note: Historian Francisco Lluch Mora states (See Orígenes y Fundación de Ponce. Editorial Casa Mayor. Segunda Edición. 2006. p. 40.) that José de Toro was a teniente a guerra mayor of Ponce, in addition to 1814 and 1820, also in 1710. Lluch Mora appears to be assuming that the 1710 teniente a guerra mayor Joseph de Toro is the same individual as the José de Toro in this article. However, this would not have been biologically possible for this reason: There would be just too large a period of time between De Toro's first alleged mayoral term (1710) and his second (1814) - 104 years! Even if we assumed that the 1710 Joseph de Toro started his mayoral term as soon as he was an 18-year-old adult, he would have been 132 years old at the start of his second mayoral term (in 1814), and 138 years old at the start of his alleged third term (in 1820). Of course, since a soldier did not achieve the rank of teniente a guerra without first moving through the lower ranks (i.e., cabo a guerra and capitán a guerra), the likelihood that José de Toro was mayor in 1710 at 18 years old is even more remote, making it necessary for him to have entered his alleged third mayoral term, not around 138 years old, but perhaps closer to 150 years old. This, of course, would not have been possible, at least not without much having been written about the alleged 150-year-old mayor in the medical, political, biological, and genealogical literature of the 1820s worldwide. Considering them to be different men (that, perhaps, were relatives) is the only obvious explanation. For this reason, Wikipedia has not one but two articles about these two mayors.) occasions: 1814 and in 1820 (starting on 3 June 1820). In 1814, he performed as a teniente a guerra mayor, while from 3 June 1820 until later that year he performed as Alcalde ordinario.

== First mayoral term (1814) ==
In 1814, while José de Toro was mayor of Ponce and his secretary was Jose Inchausty, a cemetery was built at the (then) end of Calle Unión. At the time calle Union had no houses and the lands were part of Hacienda Molina. The cemetery, which no longer exists, was active for 28 years - until 1842 - when it was replaced by the cemetery at Panteón Nacional Román Baldorioty de Castro.

== Second mayoral term (1820) ==
In 1820, the first known division of the Ponce territory into barrios takes place.

== Legacy ==
There is a street in Urbanización Las Delicias of Barrio Magueyes in Ponce named after him.

== See also ==
- List of Puerto Ricans
- List of mayors of Ponce, Puerto Rico

== Notes ==
Political offices
| Preceded by José Ortiz de la Renta | Mayor of Ponce, Puerto Rico; 1814–1814 | Succeeded by José Ortiz de la Renta |
| Preceded by Joaquín Martínez | Mayor of Ponce, Puerto Rico; 3 June 1820 – 1820 | Succeeded by José Ortiz de la Renta |
