= Santaella (surname) =

Santaella is a surname. Notable people with the surname include:

- Demetrio Santaella (c. 1807 - c. 1887), Puerto Rican politician
- Katty Santaella (born 1967), Venezuelan judoka
- Lucia Santaella (born 1944), Brazilian PhD in semiotics
- Silvana Santaella (born 1983), Venezuelan beauty pageant titleholder
