= Antonio E. Molina =

Mayor of Ponce, Puerto Rico

59th Mayor of Ponce, Puerto Rico
- In office 14 February 1854 – 24 July 1854
- Preceded by: José Benito Paz Falcón
- Succeeded by: Félix O'Neill

Personal details
- Born: c. 1820
- Died: 21 August 1899 Ponce, Puerto Rico
- Occupation: Farmer

Antonio E. Molina (c. 1820 – 21 August 1899) was one of five interim mayors of Ponce, Puerto Rico, during the six-month period of 14 February 1854 to 24 July 1854.

== Introduction to politics ==
In 1853, prior to becoming mayor, Molina (together with Esteban Vidal, Bienaventura Font, Salvador Coronas and Pedro Alfonso) had been members of the Ponce Municipal Assembly. At that time a member of the municipal assembly was called regidor. The other four interim mayors during that six-month period were Julio Duboc, Escolástico Fuentes, Pablo Manfredi, and José Benito Paz Falcón.

== Mayoral term ==
In 1854, an anonymous humorous and satirical brochure titled Ensaladillas appeared in Ponce which was not well received. On 31 December 1854, the mayor of Ponce published an edict in the local newspaper that anyone caught reading or copying the brochure would be fined 4 pesos.

== Death ==
Molina died in Ponce on 21 August 1899 and was interred at Cementerio Civil de Ponce.

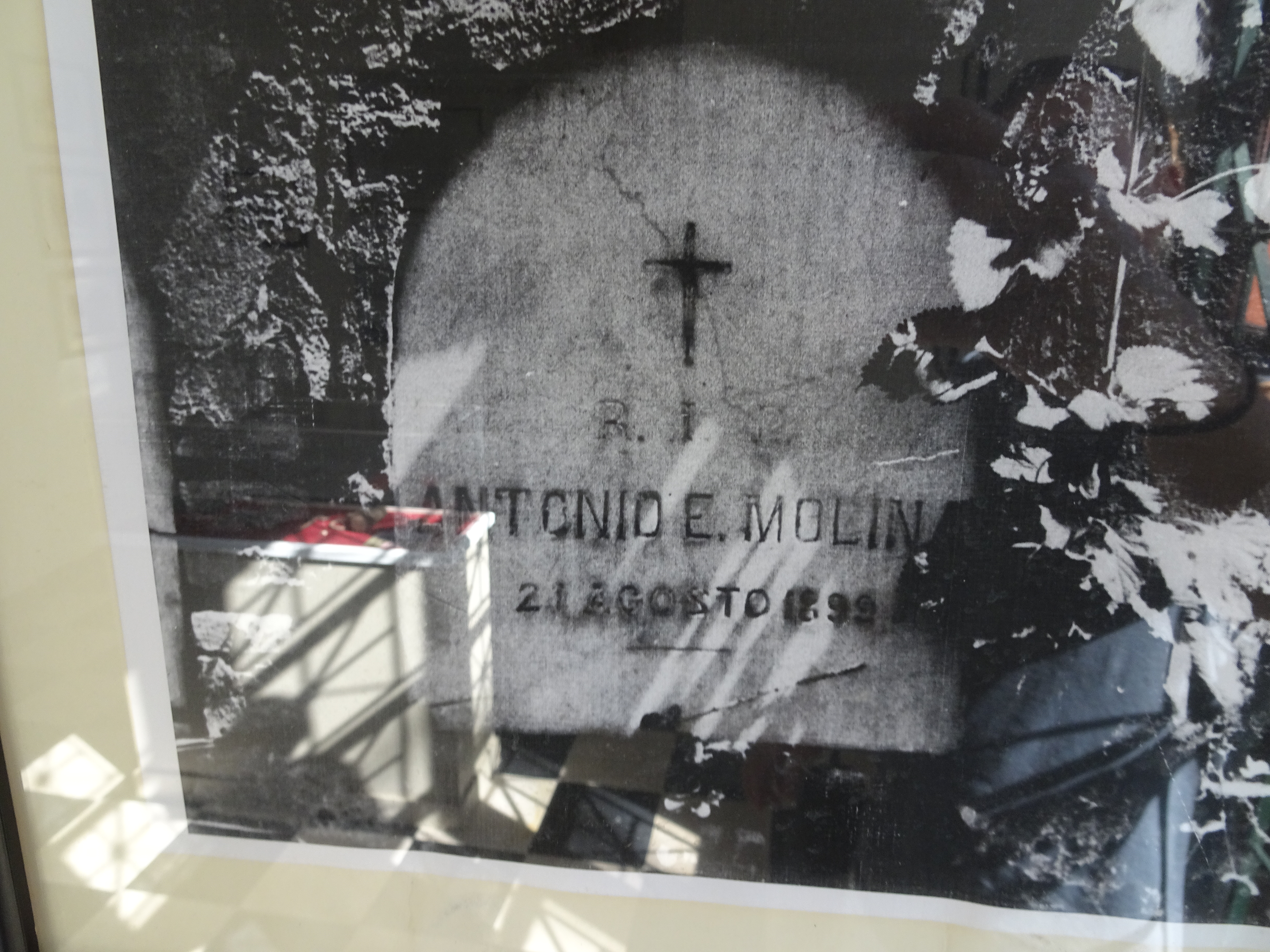
Tomb of Alcalde Antonio E. Molina, Cementerio Civil de Ponce

== See also ==
- List of Puerto Ricans
- List of mayors of Ponce, Puerto Rico

Political offices
Preceded by José Benito Paz Falcón	Mayor of Ponce, Puerto Rico; 14 February 1854 – 24 July 1854	Succeeded by Félix O'Neill
