= José Benito Paz Falcón =

Mayor of Ponce, Puerto Rico

58th Mayor of Ponce, Puerto Rico
- In office 14 February 1854 – 24 July 1854
- Preceded by: Pablo Manfredi
- Succeeded by: Antonio E. Molina

Personal details
- Born: c. 1800
- Died: c. 1860
- Profession: Pharmacist

José Benito Paz Falcón (c. 1800 – c. 1860) was one of five interim mayors of Ponce, Puerto Rico, during the period of 14 February 1854 to 24 July 1854. The other four interim mayors during that six-month period were Julio Duboc, Escolástico Fuentes, Pablo Manfredi, and Antonio E. Molina.

== Introduction to politics ==
In 1820, Paz Falcón had been part of the Ponce ayuntamiento under mayor Ortiz de la Renta where he performed as one of two Sindico procurador, some 34 years before he became mayor himself. In 1822, he was elected to serve as Diputado provincial (provincial representative).

== See also ==
- List of Puerto Ricans
- List of mayors of Ponce, Puerto Rico

Political offices
Preceded by Pablo Manfredi	Mayor of Ponce, Puerto Rico; 14 February 1854 - 24 July 1854	Succeeded by Antonio E. Molina
