= David Laporte =

Mayor of Ponce, Puerto Rico

43rd Mayor of Ponce, Puerto Rico
- In office 1 January 1847 – 30 June 1847
- Preceded by: José de Jesús Fernández
- Succeeded by: Francisco Romero

Personal details
- Born: c. 1787
- Died: c. 1857
- Profession: Hacendado

David Laporte (ca. 1787 – ca. 1857) was Mayor of Ponce, Puerto Rico, from 1 January 1847 – 30 June 1847.

== See also ==
- List of mayors of Ponce, Puerto Rico
- List of Puerto Ricans

Political offices
Preceded by José de Jesús Fernández	Mayor of Ponce, Puerto Rico; 1 January 1847 – 30 June 1847	Succeeded by Francisco Romero
