= Francisco Romero (mayor) =

Mayor of Ponce, Puerto Rico

44th Mayor of Ponce, Puerto Rico
- In office 1 July 1847 – 31 August 1847
- Preceded by: David Laporte
- Succeeded by: Juan Lacot

66th Mayor of Ponce, Puerto Rico
- In office 1 September 1866 – 31 October 1866 (?)
- Preceded by: Francisco Carreras
- Succeeded by: Carlos Cabrera y Martínez

Personal details
- Born: ca. 1790
- Died: ca. 1870
- Profession: Landowner

Francisco Romero (ca. 1790 – ca. 1870) was an interim Mayor of Ponce, Puerto Rico, in 1847 and again in 1866.

== Background ==
Francisco Romero came to Puerto Rico from Venezuela around 1821 and settled in Ponce, where he was a landowner. In 1836, Romero had been one of a team of three assistants to Barrio Playa mayor, (Note: At that time, barrios had "mayors"; they were, however, not vested with legal authority and only had limited administrative authority.) Sargent Rafael Muñoz, before becoming mayor of Ponce some 10 years later.

== First mayoral term (1847) ==
Romero was mayor of Ponce starting on 1 July 1847, and ended his mayoral term around 31 August 1847 when Juan Lacot took over.

== Second mayoral term (1866) ==
Romero was interim corregidor mayor of Ponce starting on 1 September 1866 and ending sometime around 31 October 1866 when another interim corregidor mayor, Carlos Cabrera y Martínez, took over.

== See also ==
- List of Puerto Ricans
- List of mayors of Ponce, Puerto Rico

Political offices
Preceded by David Laporte	Mayor of Ponce, Puerto Rico; 1 July 1847 - 31 August 1847	Succeeded by Juan Lacot
Preceded by Francisco Carreras	Mayor of Ponce, Puerto Rico; 1 September 1866 - 31 October 1866?	Succeeded by Carlos Cabrera y Martínez
