= Juan Cortada y Quintana =

Puerto Rican politician

76th Mayor of Ponce, Puerto Rico
- In office 27 September 1872 – 4 February 1874
- Preceded by: Alejandro Albizu
- Succeeded by: Pedro Rosalí

Personal details
- Born: ca. 1820 Ponce, Puerto Rico
- Died: 22 August 1889 Ponce, Puerto Rico
- Spouse(s): Mercedes Tirado (d. 1871), Vicenta Albizu, Providencia Martorell
- Relations: Ramon and Manuel (brothers)
- Children: With Mercedes Tirado: Juan (b. 1864); Eduardo; With Vicenta Albizu: Vicente; José Antonio; With Providencia Martorell: Joaquín; Dora Providencia
- Occupation: Plantation farmer

Juan Cortada y Quintana (c. 1820 – 22 August 1889) was a Puerto Rican politician, businessman, and landowner. He served as Mayor of Ponce, Puerto Rico, from 27 September 1872 to 4 February 1874.

== Early years ==
Cortada y Quintana was the son of Juan Cortada (Note: Since this Juan Cortada would have been around 58 years old in 1852, it is likely this Juan Cortada (Sr.) was the Segundo teniente de alcalde (note: this is not the same as "Alcalde") that Emilio J. Pasarell talks about in his Esculcando el Siglo XIX en Puerto Rico (1967), page 48. If this is the case, then Juan Cortada Sr., Juan Cortada y Quintana, and Juan Cortada Tirado were all three involved in politics in Puerto Rico.) (c.1794-1865), born in Catalunya, Spain, and Monserrate Quintana. He had two brothers, Ramon and Manuel.

== Hacendado ==
Cortada and his brother Ramón were hacendados, landowners who owned several sugarcane haciendas like Hacienda Descalabrado (then known as Central Cortada), Las Mercedes, La Palmarito, and La Mallorquina, among others. They were located in the region between Ponce and Santa Isabel.

The workers in such estates were almost always slaves. Thus it is likely that Cortada owned slaves in working his sugarcane farm. Some sources confirm that Cortada in fact owned 28 slaves in 1872, one year before the abolition of slavery in Puerto Rico.

Since 1868, Cortada's estate had irrigation problems, which led Cortada to ask for permits to use the waters of the Río Descalabrado river to irrigate his land. After some financial troubles, and with the death of his first wife, Cortada ceded the ownership of the Hacienda Descalabrado to his two young sons, Juan and Eduardo. However, this change wasn't registered. Cortada also had debts for the mortgage of the land where Hacienda Palmarito was established. In 1874, he had to sell Hacienda Descalabrado, but he recovered it in 1884.

== Lender ==
Cortada, together with his brother Ramón, was also in the money-lending business, lending capital to 11 other hacendados in the area. By 1870, Cortada owned five haciendas in the municipality of Ponce.

== Mayoral term ==
Cortada served as Mayor of Ponce from 27 September 1872 to 4 February 1874. This was the time when the Republica Española (Spanish Republic) was declared (11 February 1873) and also the time when slavery was abolished in Puerto Rico (22 March 1873). Cortada's municipal assembly consisted of: Rafael Pujals, Federico Capo, Jose Antonio Renta, Celedonio Besosa, Olimpio Otero, Lazaro Martinez, Marcos Fugurull (padre/father), Juan Jose Mayoral, Guillermo Oppenheimer, and Gustavo Cabrera.

== Personal life ==
Juan Cortada y Quintana married three times. His first marriage was to Mercedes Tirado, with whom he procreated two sons: Juan (born 1864) and Eduardo. Mercedes died in 1871. Cortada's second marriage was to Vicenta Albizu, with whom he had two more children: Vicente and José Antonio. His third marriage was with Providencia Martorell. They had a son and a daughter: Joaquín and Dora Providencia. Cortada y Quintana died on 22 August 1889.

== Legacy ==
There is a street in a Ponce neighborhood, Urbanización Las Delicias, of Barrio Magueyes named after him.

== See also ==
- List of Puerto Ricans
- List of mayors of Ponce, Puerto Rico

== Notes ==
Political offices
Preceded by Alejandro Albizu	Mayor of Ponce, Puerto Rico; 27 September 1872 – 4 February 1874	Succeeded by Pedro Rosalí
