= Juan José Cartagena =

Mayor of Ponce, Puerto Rico

80th Mayor of Ponce, Puerto Rico
- In office 1 April 1876 – 4 July 1879
- Preceded by: Serafín Donderis
- Succeeded by: Lucas Jiménez

83rd Mayor of Ponce, Puerto Rico
- In office 1 February 1881 – 1 October 1881
- Preceded by: José Mirelis
- Succeeded by: Andrés Caparrós y García

Personal details
- Born: c. 1815
- Died: c. 1895
- Profession: politician

Juan José Cartagena (c. 1815 – c. 1895) was Mayor of Ponce, Puerto Rico, from April 1876 to 4 July 1879, and again from February 1881 to October 1881.

== First mayoral term (1876) ==
During the first of his mayoral terms, Cartagena was mayor of Ponce from April 1876 to 4 July 1879. Others who worked during his administration included Dr. Rafael del Valle, Dr. Manuel Pasarell, the journalist Mario Braschi, and historian Eduardo Neumann Gandía.

Cartagena is best remembered for overseeing the installation of the clock on the front facade of Casa Alcadia. The now famous clock was brought from London and its installation was performed under the care of Julio E. Steinacker. The clock cost 1,000 Spanish pesos ($1,000 ($30,234 in 2025 dollars)). It was installed on 13 August 1877, the same day that Ponce received the title of "City" by the Spanish Crown. The construction of the Hospital Tricoche also occurred under Cartagena's administration, and on 11 December 1878 Cartagena gave an inaugural speech for the opening of the hospital.

== Second mayoral term (1881) ==
Unlike his multi-year mayoral term in 1876 to 1879, Cartagena governed the municipality of Ponce in 1881 for only 8 months, from February through the end of September.

== Honors ==
There is a street in Urbanización Las Delicias of Barrio Magueyes in Ponce named after him.

== See also ==
- List of Puerto Ricans
- List of mayors of Ponce, Puerto Rico

Political offices
Preceded by Serafín Donderis	Mayor of Ponce, Puerto Rico; 1 April 1876 – 4 July 1879	Succeeded by Lucas Jiménez
Preceded by José Mirelis	Mayor of Ponce, Puerto Rico; 1 February 1881 – 1 October 1881	Succeeded by Andrés Caparrós y García
