= José Mercado (mayor) =

Puerto Rican politician

20th Mayor of Ponce, Puerto Rico
- In office ?? 1822 – 31 December 1822
- Preceded by: José Molina
- Succeeded by: José Ortíz de la Renta

Personal details
- Born: ca. 1762
- Died: ca. 1842

Francisco José de Mercado (ca. 1762 – ca. 1842) was interim mayor of Ponce, Puerto Rico, from early in 1822 to 31 December 1822.

== Background ==
Mercado was the son of Joseph de Mercado, who was "Alcalde de la Santa Hermandad" in 1757 (San German) and teniente a guerra (Ponce) in 1763.

== Mayoral term ==
While acting as the maximum civil authority in Ponce during 1822, Mercado was interim mayor. As such, he was finishing off José Molina's term as a constitutional mayor. Mercado took over leadership of the town from Jose Ortiz de la Renta and, at the end of his term, handed over leadership to Jose Ortiz de la Renta again. There are no Acts in the Municipality of Ponce for the period 1824 to 1834, affecting the period while he was mayor as well.

== See also ==
- List of Puerto Ricans
- List of mayors of Ponce, Puerto Rico

Political offices
Preceded by José Molina	Mayor of Ponce, Puerto Rico; 22 January 1822 - 31 December 1822	Succeeded by José Ortíz de la Renta
