= Juan Dávila (politician) =

Puerto Rican mayor

11th Mayor of Ponce, Puerto Rico
- In office 1 January 1819 – 31 December 1819
- Preceded by: Alejandro Ordóñez
- Succeeded by: Francisco Vassallo

Personal details
- Born: ca. 1769
- Died: ca. 1839
- Profession: Politician

Juan Dávila was mayor of Ponce, Puerto Rico, in 1819. His Secretario Municipal (municipal clerk) was Matias Vidal.

There is a street in Urbanización Las Delicias of Barrio Magueyes in Ponce named after him.

== See also ==
- List of Puerto Ricans
- List of mayors of Ponce, Puerto Rico

Political offices
| Preceded by Alejandro Ordóñez | Mayor of Ponce, Puerto Rico; 1 January 1819 - 31 December 1819 | Succeeded by Francisco Vassallo |
