= Francisco Arce y Romero =

Interim Corregidor Mayor of Ponce, Puerto Rico

74th Mayor of Ponce, Puerto Rico
- In office 1872–1872
- Preceded by: Elicio Berriz
- Succeeded by: Alejandro Albizu

Personal details
- Born: ca. 1822
- Died: ca. 1902
- Profession: Attorney

Francisco Arce y Romero (ca. 1822 – ca. 1902) was an interim Corregidor Mayor of Ponce, Puerto Rico, in 1872. Eduardo Neumann Gandia describes him as an honest man, politically liberal and open minded.

== See also ==
- List of mayors of Ponce, Puerto Rico
- List of Puerto Ricans

Political offices
Preceded by Elicio Berriz	Mayor of Ponce, Puerto Rico; 1872 - 1872	Succeeded by Alejandro Albizu
