= Pedro Sánchez de Mathos =

First municipal magistrate of Ponce, Puerto Rico

1st Mayor of Ponce, Puerto Rico
- In office 1692–1701
- Preceded by: Position established
- Succeeded by: Dámaso de Toro

Personal details
- Born: c. 1635 San German, Puerto Rico
- Died: c. 1705 Coamo, Puerto Rico
- Spouse(s): (1st) Juana de Gracia (m. d. unknown) (2nd) Ana Benitez de Luyando (m. 26 July 1662) (3rd) Maria Colon
- Relations: Juan Lorenzo de Mathos (father); Catalina Sanchez (mother)
- Children: Juan Blas
- Occupation: Teniente a guerra
- Profession: Military

Pedro Sánchez de Mathos (Note: Also, "Pedro Sánchez de Matos" and "Pedro Sánchez Matos". See Eli D. Oquendo Rodriguez, De Criadero a Partido: Ojeada a la Historia de los Origenes de Ponce, 1645-1810. Editorial Akelarre, 2015, pages 22,23.) (c. 1635 - c. 1705) was the first municipal magistrate of Ponce, Puerto Rico, in 1692. He was appointed mayor by the Governor of Puerto Rico, Juan Robles de Lorenzana. He had been regidor (a type of municipal councilman) in San German in 1676 and was its mayor in 1688.

He was born around 1635 in San German, Puerto Rico. His parents were Juan Lorenzo de Matos and Catalina Sanchez. (Note: At the time, it was common to use the mother's last name as the first last name followed by the father's last name as the second last name. See Eli D. Oquendo Rodriguez. De Criadero a Partido: Ojeada de la Historia de los Origenes de Ponce, 1645-1810. First Edition. Lajas, Puerto Rico: Centro de Estudios e Investigaciones del Sur Oeste (CEISO). Editorial Akelarre. 2015. ISBN 1516895487. Page 103.) In 1686, Sánchez de Mathos owned six slaves, making it likely he was a landowner or cattle rancher and used slave labor to tend to the land or his cattle.

== Background ==
The difficulty of crossing the Cordillera Central, sometimes taking as long as 37 days, created unique challenges for the Spanish-appointed authorities in San Juan to govern over the entire island. As a result, the island was divided into two political regions—one based in San Juan and a second one based in San German. As years went by the political influence of the partido de San German grew to the point that it challenged that of San Juan. To reign in the growing influence from San German and maintain control over the entire island, in 1678-1683, Governor Juan Robles de Lorenzana attempted to establish additional administrative units, called partidos, carving some of them, including the one for Ponce, out of the San German jurisdiction. The plan was unsuccessful, as the governor's term came to a close and no one was interested in serving as the head of such new Partido de Ponce. In 1690, a new governor, Gaspar de Arredondo y Valle, sent a letter the Real Audiencia of the Indies in Santo Domingo where he proposed the creation of five new administrative units, including one in Ponce. As the letter went unanswered, in 1692 the governor proceeded to create, not five administrative units, but five military units, which would be headed by a military officer who would function as mayor and have powers for civilian oversight as well. In 1692, during the governorship of Gaspar de Arredondo y Valle, the Spanish Crown officially gave its blessing to the creation of the Partido de Ponce, but Ponce was already operating with a military commander functioning as a mayor, Pedro Sánchez de Mathos.

== Mayoral term ==
Given that Sánchez de Mathos was already functioning as Teniente a guerra in the jurisdiction of Ponce since December 1685, the creation of the Partido de Ponce was more of an official confirmation of his position than an appointment to a newly created position. Pedro Sánchez de Mathos functioned as mayor until 1701. He received no payment of his service as mayor.

== See also ==
- List of mayors of Ponce, Puerto Rico
- List of Puerto Ricans

== Footnotes ==
Political offices
Preceded by Position established	Mayor of Ponce, Puerto Rico; 1692-1701	Succeeded by Dámaso de Toro
