= Demetrio Santaella =

Mayor of Ponce, Puerto Rico

69th Mayor of Ponce, Puerto Rico
- In office 22 January 1867 – 31 December 1868
- Preceded by: Enrique O'Neil
- Succeeded by: Elicio Berriz

Personal details
- Born: ca. 1807
- Died: ca. 1887
- Occupation: Military

Demetrio Santaella (ca. 1807 – ca. 1887) was Mayor of Ponce, Puerto Rico, from 22 January 1867 to 31 December 1868.

== Mayoral term ==
While acting as the maximum civil authority in Ponce during most of the year in 1867 and the entire year in 1868, Santaella was titled a "corregidor". As such, he performed as the local administrative and judicial official in the municipality. The position of corregidor obligated him to act as representative of the royal jurisdiction over the "Villa de Ponce" and its municipal area. Santaella took over leadership of the town from Spanish Colonel Enrique O'Neil and, at the end of his term, handed over leadership to Spanish Colonel Elicio Berriz.

Santaella mayored the city during the 1868 Spanish Revolution.

== See also ==
- List of Puerto Ricans
- List of mayors of Ponce, Puerto Rico

Political offices
Preceded by Enrique O'Neil	Mayor of Ponce, Puerto Rico; 22 January 1867 - 31 December 1868	Succeeded by Elicio Berriz
