= Alejandro Albizu =

Corregidor Mayor of Ponce, Puerto Rico

75th Mayor of Ponce, Puerto Rico
- In office 1 March 1872 (?) – 26 September 1872
- Preceded by: Francisco Arce y Romero
- Succeeded by: Juan Cortada y Quintana

Personal details
- Born: ca. 1812
- Died: ca. 1892

Alejandro Albizu (ca. 1812 – ca. 1892) was an interim corregidor Mayor of Ponce, Puerto Rico, from when interim corregidor Francisco Arce y Romero terminated his mayoral duties around March 1872. He mayored the municipality of Ponce until 26 September 1872.

== See also ==
- List of Puerto Ricans
- List of mayors of Ponce, Puerto Rico

Political offices
Preceded by Francisco Arce y Romero	Mayor of Ponce, Puerto Rico; 1 March 1872 (?) – 26 September 1872	Succeeded by Juan Cortada y Quintana
