= Julián Villodas =

Mayor of Ponce, Puerto Rico

23rd Mayor of Ponce, Puerto Rico
- In office 1 January 1827 – 31 December 1830
- Preceded by: Tomás Pérez Guerra
- Succeeded by: Tomás de Renovales

Personal details
- Occupation: Teniente a guerra
- Profession: Lieutenant colonel

Julián H. Villodas was Mayor of Ponce, Puerto Rico, from 1 January 1827 – 31 December 1830. He performed as a teniente a guerra.

== Mayoral term ==
Villodas is best known for serving concurrently as mayor of the nearby town of Guayama for four years (from 1830 to 1833) while he also served as mayor of Ponce. Villodas was a sugar cane plantation owner in the municipality of Guayama, which may explain why he served there as mayor.

There are no Acts in the Municipality of Ponce for the period 1824 to 1834, affecting the period while he was mayor as well, so little more is known about Julián Villodas's mayoral term. However, in April 1835, while Villodas was still mayor of Ponce, the rebuilding of the Ponce parroquial church was started. Councilmen Geronimo Rabassa, Olegario González and Jose Maria Ramirez made up the building commission.

== See also ==
- List of mayors of Ponce, Puerto Rico
- List of Puerto Ricans

Political offices
Preceded by Tomás Pérez Guerra	Mayor of Ponce, Puerto Rico; 1 January 1827 – 31 December 1830	Succeeded by Tomás de Renovales
