= Vicente Pérez Valdivieso =

Mayor of Ponce, Puerto Rico

71st Mayor of Ponce, Puerto Rico
- In office 11 May 1870 – 27 July 1871
- Preceded by: Elicio Berriz
- Succeeded by: Miguel Arribas

Personal details
- Born: ca. 1810
- Died: ca. 1890

Vicente Pérez Valdivieso (ca. 1810 – ca. 1890) was Mayor of Ponce, Puerto Rico, from 11 May 1870 to 27 July 1871.

== Mayoral term ==
Starting off as mayor on 11 May 1870, Pérez Valdivieso was the first mayor of Ponce after the institution of political parties for the first time in Puerto Rico in 1870. He is best remembered for his 10 July 1870 "Reglamento para la Guardia Municipal de la Villa de Ponce."

== See also ==
- List of Puerto Ricans
- List of mayors of Ponce, Puerto Rico

Political offices
Preceded by Elicio Berriz	Mayor of Ponce, Puerto Rico; 11 May 1870 - 27 July 1871	Succeeded by Miguel Arribas
