= José Molina (mayor) =

Mayor of Ponce, Puerto Rico (c. 1782–c. 1862)

19th Mayor of Ponce, Puerto Rico
- In office 1822–1822
- Preceded by: José Casimiro Ortíz de la Renta
- Succeeded by: José Mercado

Personal details
- Born: c. 1782 Cataluña, Spain
- Died: c. 1862 Ponce, Puerto Rico
- Occupation: Farmer; Hacendado

José Molina (a.k.a. José Molinas) was Mayor of Ponce, Puerto Rico in 1822.

== Biography ==
Molina was born in Cataluña, Spain, around 1782. In 1827 he was a landowner and slave owner, and owned an hacienda. He lived in Ponce's Barrio Oeste (now [2018] known as Barrio Segundo). He married Petrona Villar, from Ponce, and had seven children: Maria Socorro (ca. 1813), Carmen (ca. 1821), Felicita (ca. 1823), Rita (ca. 1825), Margarita (ca. 1826), Jose Maria (ca. 1828), and Dolores (ca. 1829).

Molina is best remembered for heading a collection of funds to be donated by well-to-do residents in Barrio Playa for the construction of a watch tower on the east side of Barrio Playa, at Point Peñoncillo, in order to add to the security of the Port of Ponce which, at the time, was being threatened by pirates. This collection was in response to concerns from military commander Ramon Gonzalez.

== See also ==
- Ponce, Puerto Rico
- List of Puerto Ricans

Political offices
Preceded by José Casimiro Ortíz de la Renta	Mayor of Ponce, Puerto Rico; 1822	Succeeded by José Mercado
