= List of mayors of Ponce, Puerto Rico =

This is a list of mayors of Ponce, Puerto Rico's southern economic center, the island's second largest and second most important city.

From 1692 to 1840, the office of mayor (Note: The maximum civil authority in Ponce was not always called "mayor" (or, more precisely, Alcalde). Different names were used including Teniente a guerra, Corregidor, Alcalde mayor, Alcalde ordinario, Justicia mayor, Alcalde constitucional, Alcalde en propiedad, Alcalde real ordinario, and Comandante militar.) in Ponce was filled either by local hacendados or by military officers appointed by the governor, depending on whether the political situation on Spain at the time was that of a constitutional or an absolutist government. From 1840 to 1870, mayors were oftentimes elected by the municipal council, whose members were called regidores. In 1870, political parties were created for the first time and municipal officials were elected by the people at large, and the mayor, as well as the members of the municipal council, would belong to one of the two parties active, either the Partido Liberal Reformista or the Partido Incondicional Español. With the advent of the American political system in Puerto Rico after the American invasion of 1898, the mayor was elected by popular vote, which is the system still (2019) in place.

Ponce's first (Note: In 2017, Eli D. Oquendo Rodríguez published the findings of his research about Ponce mayors in the period between 1600 and 1799. He states that Pedro Sanchez de Mathos was, in fact, not the first mayor of Ponce and that he may have been mayor much earlier than the 1692 date usually attributed him. Oquendo Rodríguez states that Ponce had at least three other mayors during this period: Don Pedro Martin Rodríguez Valverde (1683-1692), Don Pedro Rodríguez Guzman (1692-1748), and Don Pedro Rodríguez Pacheco (1748-1752). In addition, Don Phelipe de Santiago Pagan (1680, and 1687-1688) and Don Alberto de Rivera y Quiñones [Capitan a Guerra] (1690-1691) were mayors on an interim basis. See Eli D. Oquendo Rodríguez . De Criadero a Partido: Ojeada de la Historia de los Origenes de Ponce, 1645-1810. First Edition. Lajas, Puerto Rico: Centro de Estudios e Investigaciones del Sur Oeste (CEISO). Editorial Akelarre. 2015. ISBN 1516895487. Pages 102-105.) mayor was Don Pedro Sánchez de Mathos, in 1692, appointed by governor Juan Robles de Lorenzana. Ponce elected its first mayor (as well as its first Municipal Assembly) on 20 September 1812. Its first elected mayor was José Ortiz de la Renta, who took office in 1812. Ortiz de la Renta occupied the post of mayor on eight occasions between 1812 and 1846. The current mayor is Marlese Sifre Rodríguez, from the Partido Popular Democratico, in office since 2 November 2023.

Throughout the centuries the Ponce municipal heads of government listed here as "mayors" may have held titles different from the modern title of "Mayor". (Note: Titles differed not only due to changing political conditions in Spain (e.g., constitutional vs. non-constitutional governments) but also due to the manner how the person came to hold the position (e.g., appointed by the King or by the Provincial Governor vs. elected by the municipal council or municipal assembly or the political party vs. elected by the people at large).) Some of the other titles held were Teniente a guerra, Corregidor, Alcalde mayor, Alcalde ordinario, Justicia mayor, Alcalde constitucional, Alcalde en propiedad, Alcalde real ordinario, and Comandante militar. Regardless of the titles held, the people listed here were the maximum civil authority at the municipal level. In the lists that follow, "Alcalde" refers to the Spanish colonial position attained via election by the regidores (council members) of the municipal council, and refers to someone who had both judicial and administrative functions. "Mayor", on the other hand, refers to a local executive, elected by the people, with administrative functions only.

== 18th century ==
Source: Eduardo Neumann Gandía, Enciclopedia de Puerto Rico, and Neysa Rodríguez Deynes.

#	Name	In office	Position held	Political party (Note: There were no political parties in Puerto Rico until 1870. See, Socorro Giron. Ramon Marin y su Tiempo. In, Ramon Marin's Las Fiestas Populares de Ponce. Editorial de la Universidad de Puerto Rico. 1994. p. 16.)
1	Pedro Sánchez de Mathos	1692 – 1701	Teniente a guerra	N/A
2	Dámaso de Toro	1701 – 1706	Teniente a guerra	N/A
3	Aurelio Juan Ramírez de Arellano	1706 – 1710	Teniente a guerra	N/A
4	Joseph de Toro	1710 – ?	Teniente a guerra	N/A
5	Francisco Ortíz de la Renta	1766	Teniente a guerra	N/A

== 19th century ==
Sources: Eduardo Neumann Gandía, Enciclopedia de Puerto Rico, and Neysa Rodríguez Deynes.

#	Name	In office	Position held	Political party (Note: There were no political parties in Puerto Rico until 1870. See, Socorro Giron. Ramon Marin y su Tiempo. In, Ramon Marin's Las Fiestas Populares de Ponce. Editorial de la Universidad de Puerto Rico. 1994. p. 16.)
6	José Benítez	1 January 1800 – 31 December 1811	Teniente a guerra	N/A
7	José Ortíz de la Renta (Note: José Ortíz de la Renta was also Mayor #9, #15, #21, #29, #33, #35, and #41)	1 January 1812 – 31 December 1813	Alcalde constitucional	N/A
8	José de Toro (Note: José de Toro was also Mayor #14)	1 January 1814 – 31 December 1814	Teniente a guerra	N/A
9	José Ortíz de la Renta (Note: José Ortíz de la Renta was also Mayor #7, #15, #21, #29, #33, #35, and #41)	1 January 1815 – 2 January 1816	Teniente a guerra	N/A
10	Alejandro Ordóñez	3 January 1816 – 31 December 1818	Teniente justicia mayor	N/A
11	Juan Dávila	1 January 1819 – 31 December 1819	Alcalde ordinario	N/A
12	Francisco Vassallo (Note: Francisco Vassallo was also Mayor #25)	1 January 1820 – ca. 2 May 1820	Comandante militar and alcalde (Note: According to Eduardo Neumann Gandia, Francisco Vassallo performed as "Comandante militar and Alcalde" from 1 January 1820 to ca. 2 May 1820.)	N/A
13	Joaquín Martínez	ca. 2 May 1820 – ca. 3 June 1820	Alcalde ordinario	N/A
14	José de Toro (Note: José de Toro was also Mayor #8)	ca. 3 June 1820 – ? 1820	Alcalde ordinario	N/A
15	José Ortíz de la Renta (Note: José Ortíz de la Renta was also Mayor #7, #9, #21, #29, #33, #35, and #41)	? 1820 – 31 December 1820	Alcalde constitucional	N/A
16	José Casimiro Ortíz de la Renta (Note: José Casimiro Ortíz de la Renta was also Mayor #18)	1 January 1821 – ?	Alcalde constitucional	N/A
17	Joaquín Tellechea	? 1821 – ? 1821	Alcalde constitucional (interim)	N/A
18	José Casimiro Ortíz de la Renta (Note: José Casimiro Ortíz de la Renta was also Mayor #16)	? 1821 – 31 December 1821	Alcalde constitucional	N/A
19	José Molina	1 January 1822 – ? 1822	Alcalde constitucional	N/A
20	José Mercado	? 1822 – 31 December 1822	Alcalde constitucional (interim)	N/A
21	José Ortíz de la Renta (Note: José Ortíz de la Renta was also Mayor #7, #9, #15, #29, #33, #35, and #41)	1 January 1823 – 31 December 1825	Alcalde propietario	N/A
22	Tomás Pérez Guerra	1 January 1826 – 31 December 1826	Alcalde real ordinario	N/A
23	Julián Villodas	1 January 1827 – 31 December 1830	Teniente a guerra	N/A
24	Tomás de Renovales	1 January 1831 – 31 December 1831	Alcalde	N/A
25	Francisco Vassallo (Note: Francisco Vassallo was also Mayor #12)	1 January 1832 – 31 December 1832	Comandante militar and alcalde (Note: According to Eduardo Neumann Gandia, Francisco Vassallo performed as "Comandante militar and Alcalde" from 1 January 1820 to ca. 2 May 1820.)	N/A
26	Antonio Toro	1 January 1833 – 31 December 1835	Alcalde	N/A
27	Antonio Albizu	1 January 1836 – ? 1836	Teniente alcalde	N/A
28	Juan de Dios Conde (Note: Juan de Dios Conde was also Mayor #31)	? 1836 – 31 December 1836	Alcalde	N/A
29	José Ortíz de la Renta (Note: José Ortíz de la Renta was also Mayor #7, #9, #15, #21, #33, #35, and #41)	1 January 1837 – 31 December 1837	Alcalde	N/A
30	Patricio Colón	1 January 1838 – 31 December 1838	Alcalde	N/A
31	Juan de Dios Conde (Note: Juan de Dios Conde was also Mayor #28)	1 January 1839 – 31 December 1839	Alcalde	N/A
32	Salvador de Vives (Note: Salvador de Vives was also Mayor #37)	1 January 1840 – 5 January 1842	Alcalde	N/A
33	José Ortíz de la Renta (Note: José Ortíz de la Renta was also Mayor #7, #9, #15, #21, #29, #35, and #41)	6 January 1842 – 31 December 1842	Alcalde	N/A
34	Juan Rondón	1 January 1843 – ? 1843	Alcalde	N/A
35	José Ortíz de la Renta (Note: José Ortíz de la Renta was also Mayor #7, #9, #15, #21, #29, #33, and #41)	? 1843 - 31 December 1843	Propietario	N/A
36	Bonifacio Martínez de Baños	1 January 1844 – 31 December 1844	Alcalde (Note: La Gaceta de Puerto Rico uses the term "Alcalde mayor" for Bonifacio Martínez de Baños, which may have been a way of differentiating him from the then-existing alcaldes de barrio (community mayors))	N/A
37	Salvador de Vives (Note: Salvador de Vives was also Mayor #32)	1 January 1844 – 24 November 1845	Alcalde en propiedad	N/A
38	Antonio Corro (Note: Antonio Corro was also Mayor #40)	25 November 1845 – 30 November(?) 1845	Alcalde (interim)	N/A
39	José Zaldo	1 December(?) 1845 – 31 December 1845	Alcalde (interim)	N/A
40	Antonio Corro (Note: Antonio Corro was also Mayor #38)	1 January 1846 – 31 March 1846	Alcalde (interim)	N/A
41	José Ortíz de la Renta (Note: José Ortíz de la Renta was also Mayor #7, #9, #15, #21, #29, #33, and #35)	1 April 1846 – 30 June 1846	Alcalde	N/A
42	José de Jesús Fernández	1 July 1846 – 31 December 1846	Alcalde	N/A
43	David Laporte	1 January 1847 – 30 June 1847	Alcalde	N/A
44	Francisco Romero (Note: Francisco Romero was also Mayor #66)	1 July 1847 – 31 August 1847	Alcalde	N/A
45	Juan Lacot	1 September 1847 – 31 September 1848	Alcalde	N/A
46	José María Quesada	1 October 1848 – 31 December 1848	Alcalde	N/A
47	Juan Prats (Note: Juan Prats was also Mayor #49)	1 January 1849 – 30 June 1849	Alcalde	N/A
48	Esteban Vidal	1 July 1849 – 30 September 1849	Alcalde	N/A
49	Juan Prats (Note: Juan Prats was also Mayor #47)	1 October 1849 – 31 December 1849	Alcalde	N/A
50	Flavius Dede	1 January 1850 – 31 March 1850	Alcalde	N/A
51	Coronel Antonio Fortún	1 April 1850 – 8 January 1851	Corregidor	N/A
52	Manuel Cedeño de Poveda	9 January 1851 – 23 April 1851	Corregidor	N/A
53	Guillermo Neumann	23 April 1851 – 30 September 1851	Corregidor	N/A
54	Coronel Vicente Julbe	1 October 1851 – 14 February 1854	Corregidor	N/A
55	Julio Duboc	14 February 1854(?) – 14 March 1854(?)	Alcalde (interim)	N/A
56	Escolástico Fuentes	14 March 1854(?) – 14 April 1854(?)	Alcalde (interim)	N/A
57	Pablo Manfredi	14 April 1854(?) – 14 May 1854(?)	Alcalde (interim)	N/A
58	José Benito Paz Falcón	14 May 1854(?) – 14 June 1854(?)	Alcalde (interim)	N/A
59	Antonio E. Molina	14 June 1854(?) – 23 July 1854(?)	Alcalde (interim)	N/A
60	Coronel Félix O'Neill	24 July 1854 – 31 August 1856	Comandante militar	N/A
61	Pedro Juan Capó	1 September 1856 – 31 December 1856	Corregidor	N/A
62	Hilarión Pérez Guerra	1 January 1857 – 11 July 1863	Corregidor	N/A
63	Coronel Luis de Quixano y Font	11 July 1863 – 23 June 1865	Corregidor	N/A
64	Francisco Olazarra	23 June 1865 – 31 December 1865	Corregidor	N/A
65	Francisco Carreras	1 January 1866 – 31 August 1866	Corregidor	N/A
66	Francisco Romero (Note: Francisco Romero was also Mayor #44)	1 September 1866 – 31 October 1866 (?)	Corregidor (interim)	N/A
67	Carlos Cabrera y Martínez	1 November 1866 (?) – 1 December 1866	Corregidor (interim)	N/A
68	Coronel Enrique O'Neil	1 December 1866 – 21 January 1867	Corregidor	N/A
69	Demetrio Santaella	21 January 1867 – 31 December 1868	Corregidor	N/A
70	Coronel Elicio Berriz (Note: Elicio Berriz was also Mayor #73)	1 January 1869 – 11 May 1870	Comandante militar	N/A
71	Vicente Pérez Valdivieso	11 May 1870 – 27 July 1871	Alcalde	-
72	Miguel Arribas	28 July 1871 – 31 December 1871	Alcalde	-
73	Coronel Elicio Berriz (Note: Elicio Berriz was also Mayor #70)	1 January 1872 – 31 January 1872 (?)	Comandante militar	-
74	Francisco Arce y Romero	1 February 1872 (?) – 28 February 1872 (?)	Corregidor (interim)	-
75	Alejandro Albizu	1 March 1872 (?) – 26 September 1872	Corregidor (interim)	-
76	Juan Cortada y Quintana	27 September 1872 – 4 February 1874	Alcalde popular	-
77	Pedro Rosalí	4 February 1874 – 5 May 1874	Alcalde	-
78	Rafael León y García	5 May 1874 – 28 April 1875	Alcalde	-
79	Coronel Serafín Donderis	28 April 1875 – 31 March 1876	Alcalde	-
80	Juan José Cartagena (Note: Juan José Cartagena was also Mayor #83)	1 April 1876 – 4 July 1879	Alcalde	-
81	Coronel Lucas Jiménez	4 July 1879 – 30 April 1880	Alcalde	-
82	Coronel José Mirelis	1 May 1880 – 31 January 1881	Alcalde delegado	-
83	Juan José Cartagena (Note: Juan José Cartagena was also Mayor #80)	1 February 1881 – 31 October 1881	Alcalde	-
84	Andrés Caparrós y García	1 October 1881 – 28 September 1882	Alcalde	-
85	Máximo de Meana y Guridi	28 September 1882 – 31 May 1884	Alcalde delegado	Incondicional Español
86	Rafael de Zárate y Sequera	11 June 1884 (Note: There was an apparent gap in mayoral service between Meana y Guridi leaving the mayor's office and De Zárate y Sequera taking over) – 16 July 1886	Alcalde	Incondicional Español
87	Ramón Elices Montes	16 July 1886 – 31 May 1887	Alcalde	Incondicional Español
88	Ermelindo Salazar	1 June 1887 – 10 July 1887	Alcalde	-
89	Fernando Diez de Ulzurrún y Somellera (Note: Socorro Girón (1992) spells Fernando Diez de Ulzurrún y Somellera's name differently ("Fernando Díez de Ulzurrum y Somellers", note the 3 differences, not just one), in "Ponce, el teatro La Perla y La Campana de la Almudaina", page 231. However, Eduardo Neumann Gandía (1913), in "Verdadera y Auténtica Historia de la Ciudad de Ponce" page 279, spells it "Fernando Diez de Ulzurrum y Somellera" (note the 2 differences, not just one). In this article, it is spelled consistent with the spelling found in the oldest source available, Felix Pubill's La Administración Municipal de Ponce. (1900).)	10 July 1887 – 4 January 1888	Alcalde	Incondicional Español
90	Juan de Ponte	5 January 1888 – 4 April 1888	Alcalde	Incondicional Español
91	Vicente de Soliveres y Miera	5 April 1888 – 19 March 1889 (Note: There is an apparent gap in mayoral service from Vicente de Solivares y Miera's leaving office on 19 March 1889 and Miguel Rosich y Más taking office on 8 May 1889)	Alcalde	Incondicional Español
92	Miguel Rosich y Más (Note: Miguel Rosich y Más was also Mayor #99)	8 May 1889 – 31 March 1890	Alcalde	Liberal Reformista (Note: Félix Pubill (La Administración Municipal de Ponce, p. 1) calls Rosich y Mas "primer alcalde popular" (first popular mayor) and states (p. 47) the opposition, represented by incoming governor Lasso and mayor Ayo, was the "Partido Incondicional [Español]". Since there were only two political parties at the time, the conclusion is that by "first alcalde popular" he actually means first alcalde from the Partido Liberal Reformista.)
93	Carlos Eusebio de Ayo	12 April 1890 – 2 January 1893	Alcalde	Incondicional Español
94	Comandante José de Nouvilas de Vilar	3 January 1893 – 9 August 1894	Comandante militar	Incondicional Español
95	Eduardo Armstrong	10 August 1894 – 3 May 1895	Alcalde	Liberal Reformista (Note: Félix Pubill (La Administración Municipal de Ponce, p. 1) calls Rosich y Mas "primer alcalde popular" (first popular mayor) and states (p. 47) the opposition, represented by incoming governor Lasso and mayor Ayo, was the "Partido Incondicional [Español]." Since there were only two political parties at the time, the conclusion is that by "primer alcalde popular" he actually meant first alcalde from the Partido Liberal Reformista.)
96	Félix Saurí y Vivas	13 May 1895 – 11 July 1895	Alcalde	Incondicional Español
97	Juan José Potous	12 July 1895 – 10 May 1896	Alcalde	Incondicional Español
98	Comandante Luis Alvarado y González	11 May 1896 – 28 March 1897	Comandante militar	Incondicional Español
99	Miguel Rosich y Más (Note: Miguel Rosich y Más was also Mayor #92)	29 March 1897 - 8 December 1897	Alcalde	Liberal Reformista (Note: Félix Pubill (La Administración Municipal de Ponce, p. 1) calls Rosich y Mas "primer alcalde popular" (first popular mayor) and states (p. 47) the opposition, represented by incoming governor Lasso and mayor Ayo, was the "Partido Incondicional [Español]". Since there were only two political parties at the time, the conclusion is that by "first alcalde popular" he actually means first alcalde from the Partido Liberal Reformista.)
100	Luis Gautier	9 December 1897 – 20 June 1898	Alcalde	-
101	Ulpiano Colóm	8 July 1898 (Note: There is an apparent break in mayoral service from Luis Gautier's mayoral term termination on 20 June 1898 to Ulpiano Colom's mayoral start on 8 July 1898) – 8 November 1898	Alcalde	-
102	José Lloréns Echevarría	8 November 1898 – 10 November 1898	Alcalde	-
103	Luis Porrata Doria	11 November 1898 – 12 September 1899	Alcalde	-
104	Major Albert L. Myer	12 September 1899 – 1899	Comandante militar	-

== 20th century ==
#	Name	In office	Position held	Political party
105	Pedro Juan Rosaly	23 December 1900 – 28 February 1901	Mayor	Republican (Note: Note: In his Estadísticas de las Elecciones Municipales de Puerto Rico (1900-1988), (Comisión Estatal de Elecciones. Mayagüez, Puerto Rico. 1992), page 120, Fernando Bayron Toro, shows the 1900 Ponce municipal elections (a.k.a., "Elecciones de los 100 días", the 100 days elections) were won by the Partido Republicano Puertorriqueño with the 65.1% of votes cast, and the 1900 regular municipal elections were won by the PRP with 99.9% of the votes cast.)
106	José de Guzmán Benítez	28 February 1901 – 2 January 1902	Mayor	Republican (Note: Note: In his Estadísticas de las Elecciones Municipales de Puerto Rico (1900-1988), (Comisión Estatal de Elecciones. Mayagüez, Puerto Rico. 1992), page 120), Fernando Bayron Toro, shows the 1900 Ponce municipal elections (a.k.a., "Elecciones de los 100 días", the 100 days elections) were won by the Partido Republicano Puertorriqueño with the 65.1% of votes cast, and the 1900 regular municipal elections were won by the PRP with 99.9% of the votes cast.)
107	Enrique Chevalier	2 January 1902 – 2 January 1903	Mayor	Republican (Note: Note: In his Estadísticas de las Elecciones Municipales de Puerto Rico (1900-1988), (Comisión Estatal de Elecciones. Mayagüez, Puerto Rico. 1992), page 120), Fernando Bayron Toro, shows the 1900 Ponce municipal elections were won by the Partido Republicano Puertorriqueño with the 99.9% of votes cast.)
108	Antonio Arias	2 January 1903 – 1 January 1904	Mayor	Republican (Note: Note: In his Estadísticas de las Elecciones Municipales de Puerto Rico (1900-1988), (Comisión Estatal de Elecciones. Mayagüez, Puerto Rico. 1992), page 120), Fernando Bayron Toro, shows the 1902 Ponce municipal elections were won by the Partido Republicano Puertorriqueño with the 59.1% of votes cast.)
109	Manuel V. Domenech	2 January 1904 – 1 January 1905	Mayor	Republican (Note: Note: In his Estadísticas de las Elecciones Municipales de Puerto Rico (1900-1988), (Comisión Estatal de Elecciones. Mayagüez, Puerto Rico. 1992.), page 120), Fernando Bayron Toro, shows the 1902 Ponce municipal elections were won by the Partido Republicano Puertorriqueño with the 59.1% of votes cast.)
110	Luis P. Valdivieso	2 January 1905 – 1 January 1906	Mayor	Union (Note: Note: Historian Eli D. Oquendo-Rodríguez categorically states Valdiveso was a Republican (See, Eli D. Oquendo-Rodríguez. Pablo L. Crespo-Vargas, editor. A Orillas del Mar Caribe: Boceto histórico de la Playa de Ponce - Desde sus primeros habitantes hasta principios del siglo XX. First edition. June 2017. Editorial Akelarre. Centro de Estudios e Investigaciones del Sur Oeste de Puerto Rico (CEISCO). Lajas, Puerto Rico. Page 226. ISBN 978-1547284931.), which appears to be an error since political historian Fernando Bayron Toro, shows the 1904 Ponce municipal elections (which led to the 1905 mayoral term) were won by the Union Party, which received 60.9% of votes cast.)
111	Santiago Oppenheimer	2 January 1906 – 1 January 1907	Mayor	Union (Note: Note: In his Estadísticas de las Elecciones Municipales de Puerto Rico (1900-1988), (Comisión Estatal de Elecciones. Mayagüez, Puerto Rico. 1992.), page 120), Fernando Bayron Toro, shows the 1904 Ponce municipal elections were won by the Union of Puerto Rico party with the 60.9% of votes cast.)
112	Simón Moret Gallart	2 January 1907 – 1 January 1915	Mayor	Union (Note: Note: In his Estadísticas de las Elecciones Municipales de Puerto Rico (1900-1988), (Comisión Estatal de Elecciones. Mayagüez, Puerto Rico. 1992.), page 120), Fernando Bayron Toro, shows the 1906, 1908, 1910, and 1912 Ponce municipal elections were won by Union of Puerto Rico party with the 65.7%, 65.3%, 63.6%, and 64.1% of votes cast, respectively. The 1914 elections were also won by the Union Party with 49.9% of the votes cast vs. Partido Republicano Puertorriqueño's 46.6% of votes.)
113	Rafael Rivera Esbrí	2 January 1915 – 1 January 1917	Mayor	Union (Note: Note: In his Estadísticas de las Elecciones Municipales de Puerto Rico (1900-1988), (Comisión Estatal de Elecciones. Mayagüez, Puerto Rico. 1992.), page 120), Fernando Bayron Toro, shows the 1914 Ponce municipal elections were won by the Union Party with 49.9% of the votes cast vs. Partido Republicano Puertorriqueño's 46.6% of votes.)
114	Luis Yordán Dávila	2 January 1917 – 1 January 1918	Mayor	Union (Note: Note: In his Estadísticas de las Elecciones Municipales de Puerto Rico (1900-1988), (Comisión Estatal de Elecciones. Mayagüez, Puerto Rico. 1992.), page 120), Fernando Bayron Toro, shows the 1914 Ponce municipal elections were won by the Union Party with 49.9% of the votes cast vs. Partido Republicano Puertorriqueño's 46.6% of votes.)
115	Rodulfo del Valle	2 January 1918 – 1 January 1921	Mayor	Union (Note: In his Estadísticas del las Elecciones Municipales de Puerto Rico (1900-1988), (Comisión Estatal de Elecciones. Mayagüez, Puerto Rico. 1992), page 120), Fernando Bayron Toro, shows the 1917 Ponce municipal elections were won by the Union of Puerto Rico party with 50.9% of votes cast.)
116	Francisco Parra Capó	2 January 1921 – 1 January 1924	Mayor	Popular ("El Ligao") (Note: In his Estadísticas del las Elecciones Municipales de Puerto Rico (1900-1988), (Comisión Estatal de Elecciones. Mayagüez, Puerto Rico. 1992), page 120), Fernando Bayron Toro, shows the 1920 Ponce municipal elections were won by the Union of Puerto Rico party with 44.6% of votes cast vs 29.5% of votes cast for the Partido Republicano Puertorriqueño.)
117	Abelardo Aguilú, Jr.	2 January 1924 – 1 January 1925	Mayor	Popular ("El Ligao") (Note: In his Estadísticas del las Elecciones Municipales de Puerto Rico (1900-1988), (Comisión Estatal de Elecciones. Mayagüez, Puerto Rico. 1992), page 120), Fernando Bayron Toro, shows the 1924 Ponce municipal elections were won by the Alianza Puertorriqueña party with 62.8% of votes cast vs 17.9% of votes cast for the Partido Socialista de Puerto Rico and 13.9% for Partido Republicano Puertorriqueño.)
118	Guillermo Vivas Valdivieso	2 January 1925 – 2 January 1929	Mayor	Alianza (Note: In his Estadísticas del las Elecciones Municipales de Puerto Rico (1900-1988), (Comisión Estatal de Elecciones. Mayagüez, Puerto Rico. 1992), page 120), Fernando Bayron Toro, shows the 1924 Ponce municipal elections were won by the Alianza Puertorriqueña party with 62.8% of votes cast vs 17.9% of votes cast for the Partido Socialista de Puerto Rico and 13.9% for Partido Republicano Puertorriqueño.)
119	Emilio Fagot	2 January 1929 – 2 January 1933	Mayor	Republican (Note: In his Estadísticas del las Elecciones Municipales de Puerto Rico (1900-1988), (Comisión Estatal de Elecciones. Mayagüez, Puerto Rico. 1992), page 120), Fernando Bayron Toro, shows the 1928 Ponce municipal elections were won by the Partido Republicano Puertorriqueño with the 59.5% of votes cast.)
120	Blas Oliveras	2 January 1933 – 2 January 1937	Mayor	Republican (Note: In his Estadísticas del las Elecciones Municipales de Puerto Rico (1900-1988), (Comisión Estatal de Elecciones. Mayagüez, Puerto Rico. 1992), page 120), Fernando Bayron Toro, shows the 1932 Ponce municipal elections were won by the Partido Republicano Puertorriqueño with the 51.5% of votes cast.)
121	José Tormos Diego	2 January 1937 – 2 January 1941	Mayor	Republican (Note: In his Estadísticas del las Elecciones Municipales de Puerto Rico (1900-1988), (Comisión Estatal de Elecciones. Mayagüez, Puerto Rico. 1992), page 120), Fernando Bayron Toro, shows the 1936 Ponce municipal elections were won by the Partido Republicano Puertorriqueño with the 52.4% of votes cast.)
122	Andrés Grillasca Salas	2 January 1941 – 9 May 1956	Mayor	PPD
123	José Dapena Laguna	9 November 1956 – 1 January 1957	Mayor	PPD
124	Carlos Juan Cintrón	2 January 1957 – 2 January 1961	Mayor	PPD
125	Juan Luis Boscio	2 January 1961 – 2 January 1965	Mayor	PPD
126	Eduardo Ruberté Bisó	2 January 1965 – 2 January 1969	Mayor	PPD
127	Juan H. Cintrón García	2 January 1969 – 2 January 1973	Mayor	PNP
128	Luis A. Morales	2 January 1973 – 2 January 1977	Mayor	PPD
129	José G. Tormos Vega	2 January 1977 – 22 February 1984	Mayor	PNP
130	José Dapena Thompson	22 February 1984 – ?? October 1988	Mayor	PNP
131	Iván Ayala Cádiz	December 1988 – 2 January 1989	Mayor	PNP
132	Rafael Cordero Santiago	2 January 1989 – 2 January 2000	Mayor	PPD

== 21st century ==
#	Name	In office	Position held	Political party
132	Rafael Cordero Santiago	2 January 2000 – 17 January 2004	Mayor	PPD
133	Delis Castillo Rivera de Santiago	17 January 2004 – 2 January 2005	Mayor (Interim)	PPD
134	Francisco Zayas Seijo	2 January 2005 – 2 January 2009	Mayor	PPD
135	Maria "Mayita" Meléndez Altieri	12 January 2009 – 11 January 2021	Mayor	PNP
136	Luis Manuel Irizarry Pabón	11 January 2021 – 2 November 2023 (Note: Irizarry Pabón was suspended from his mayoral role on 2 November 2023 by the president of the PPD political party, Jesús Manuel Ortiz, after Irizarry Pabón was accused of corruption by Puerto Rico's Panel del Fiscal Especial Independiente (Special Independent Prosecutor's Panel) (See Tribunal Apelativo confirma suspensión de Luis Irizarry Pabón como alcalde de Ponce: Luis Irizarry Pabón acudió al Foro para apelar la determinación del PFEI de suspenderlo de sus funciones. Metro Puerto Rico. 15 November 2023. Accessed 19 April 2024. Archived.) and a hearing judge in Ponce issued a bench warrant for his arrest on 31 October 2023. (See Causa para arresto contra alcalde de Ponce: Contra el alcalde se presentaron cuatro cargos por parte del PFEI. Metro Puerto Rico. 31 October 2023. Accessed 19 April 2024. Archived.) The PFEI had acted upon the April 2023 recommendation of the Puerto Rico Department of Justice. (See Causa para arresto contra alcalde de Ponce: Contra el alcalde se presentaron cuatro cargos por parte del PFEI. Metro Puerto Rico. 31 October 2023. Accessed 19 April 2024. Archived.))	Mayor	PPD
137	Marlese Sifre Rodríguez	2 November 2023 – present	Mayor	PPD

== Other mayors ==
Following is a list of other Ponce mayors according to Enciclopedia Puerto Rico but which are not accounted for in the 1913 historical account by Eduardo Neumann Gandía, Verdadera y Auténtica Historia de la Ciudad de Ponce: Desde sus Primitivos Tiempos hasta la Época Contemporánea. Source: Enciclopedia de Puerto Rico. Some of the names in this list (such as Tomás de Renovales, Francisco Vassallo and Antonio Toro) are listed in Neumann's book, but not for the additional time periods indicated in Enciclopedia Puerto Rico (and, thus, in the table that follows). The positions held are all generically listed as "Alcalde" as a placeholder; but, at least for some of them, based on the time periods Enciclopedia Puerto Rico states they served, likely held a title other than "Alcalde".

#	Name	In office	Position held	Political party
A	Juan A. Ramírez de Arellano	1692	Alcalde	N/A
B	Tomás de Renovales	1831	Alcalde	N/A
C	Francisco Vassallo	1832	Alcalde	N/A
D	Antonio Toro	1833	Alcalde	N/A
D	Bonifacio Martínez de Baños	1844	Alcalde	N/A
E	Guillermo Oppenheimer (Note: Citing Archivo General de Puerto Rico (AGPR, Protocolos Notariales-Ponce, Leonardo Morel, 1833, Vol. 1, ff. 135-135v) and Archivo Histórico de Ponce (c. 52-A, leg. 54, exp. 1. Padrón de Población, 1838), Francisco Antonio Scarano states Guillermo G. Oppenheimer was born in Germany and came to Puerto Rico from the United States. See "Sugar and slavery in Puerto Rico: the municipality of Ponce, 1815-1849." Appendix A: "On the National Origin of the Hacendados." page 445. Ph. D. Thesis. Columbia University. 1978.)	1852	Alcalde	N/A
F	Miguel Luchetti	1852	Alcalde	N/A
G	Pedro de Oña y García	1853	Alcalde	N/A
H	José Pelligero de Lama	1853	Alcalde	N/A
I	Eugenio López-Bustamante	1854	Alcalde	N/A
J	Leonardo de Campos	1866	Alcalde	N/A
K	Pedro Diz-Romero	1866	Alcalde	N/A
L	Francisco Arce y Romero	1867	Alcalde	N/A
M	Nicasio de Navascués y Asia	1868	Alcalde	N/A
N	Jacobo de Araoz y Balmaceda	1868	Alcalde	N/A
O	Recaredo Canejo y Custodio	1869	Alcalde	N/A
P	Manuel Vidal y González	1871	Alcalde	-
Q	Inocencio Vallenilla	1872	Alcalde	-
R	Manuel Vidal y González	1873	Alcalde	-
S	Teodoro Capó	1873	Alcalde	-
T	Juan Germán-Prats	1874	Alcalde	-
U	Rosendo Aquíles-Colón	1880	Alcalde	-
V	Ermelindo Salazar	1880	Alcalde	-
W	Rosendo Aquíles-Colón	1881	Alcalde	-
X	Salvador de Vives	1883	Alcalde	-
Y	Juan Mayoral	1883	Alcalde	-
Z	Ángel Fernández	1893	Alcalde	-
AA	Félix Saurí Vivas	1893	Alcalde	-
AB	Angel Fernández	1897	Alcalde	-
AC	Félix Saurí y Vivas	1897	Alcalde	-
AD	Luis Porrata-Doría	1897	Alcalde	-

== Pre-1692 mayors ==
Historians Eli D. Oquendo Rodriguez (De Criadero a Partido: Ojeada a la historia de los orígenes de Ponce, 1645-1810. 2015. p. 31.) and Francisco Lluch Mora (Orígenes y Fundación de Ponce. 2006, p. 101.) allude to various other Ponce municipal magistrates in the years preceding 1692. Among them are Juan de Quiñones (Lluch Mora), and Juan Quiñones, Pedro Sanchez, Juan Joseph Ortiz, and Andres Martinez de Quiñones (Oquendo Rodriguez).

== See also ==
- Timeline of Ponce, Puerto Rico
- Mayoralty in Puerto Rico
- Cabildo
- Cabildo insular
- Corregimiento
- Tierra Firme
- Spanish military cultural legacy
