= Juan Rondón =

Puerto Rican mayor

Juan Rondón Martínez

34th Mayor of Ponce, Puerto Rico
- In office 1843–1843
- Preceded by: José Ortiz de la Renta
- Succeeded by: José Ortiz de la Renta

Personal details
- Profession: politician

Juan Rondón Martínez (c. 1790 – c. 1843) was Mayor of Ponce, Puerto Rico, in 1843.

== Municipal works ==
Rondón Martinez is best known for having inaugurated, in 1843, Ponce's old cemetery (Viejo Cementerio de Ponce) on Calle Simon de la Torre. This cemetery, also called Antiguo Cementerio de Ponce, became the Panteón Nacional Román Baldorioty de Castro. Rondon Martínez was the first person to be buried in the cemetery.

== Honors ==
In Ponce there is a street in Urbanización Las Delicias of Barrio Magueyes named after him.

== See also ==
- List of Puerto Ricans

Political offices
Preceded by José Ortiz de la Renta	Mayor of Ponce, Puerto Rico; 1843-1843	Succeeded by José Ortiz de la Renta
