= Salvador Vives (actor) =

Spanish television actor (1943–2020)

Salvador Vives Gómez (5 March 1943, in Barcelona – 28 March 2020, in Barcelona) was a Spanish television and voice actor.

== Biography ==
Vives was born in the Poble Sec neighbourhood of Barcelona and, at just fifteen years old, entered the Institut del Teatre. He soon began to participate as an actor in plays, including "Dangerous Corner".

He worked on television numerous times in Estudio 1 in the popular TV series "Crónicas de un pueblo".

He was a supporting actor in the 1979 film "La familia bien, gracias".

Tired of traveling, he decided to focus on the world of dubbing, where he would develop a prolific career since the mid-70s. His dubbing roles included Jeremy Irons in "The Merchant of Venice", Alec Baldwin in "The Departed", Jeff Daniels in "The Hours", Liam Neeson in "Batman Begins", Michael Madsen in "Kill Bill: Volume 1" and Kill Bill: Volume 2", Rupert Everett in "My Best Friend’s Wedding", Jeff Bridges in "The Men Who Stare at Goats", Peter Capaldi in "Paddington", Chris Cooper in "The Patriot", Pierce Brosnan in "Mars Attacks!", David Strathairn in "Good Night, and Good Luck".

Among the actors whom he regularly dubbed are: Jeremy Irons, Rupert Everett, Mark Harmon, Chris Cooper, Liam Neeson, Alec Baldwin, Michael Madsen, Jeff Bridges, Beau Bridges, Pierce Brosnan, Gabriel Byrne, Jeff Daniels, Bruce Davison, Jeff Goldblum, Richard E. Grant, William H. Macy, Kyle MacLachlan, Sam Shepard, Stellan Skarsgård, David Strathairn, Christopher Walken. In Catalan, he usually dubbed Mel Gibson and Bruce Willis. He did more than 1,500 dubs.

He also worked frequently in advertising, in both Catalan and Spanish.

In 1987 he was television presenter for TV3, in "Lotto 6/49" (Catalonia’s lottery).

Vives died in Barcelona on 28 March 2020, aged 77, of COVID-19, during the pandemic in Spain.
