= Salvador de Vives =

Mayor of Ponce, Puerto Rico

Salvador de Vives Rodó

32nd Mayor of Ponce, Puerto Rico
- In office 1 January 1840 – 5 January 1842
- Preceded by: Juan de Dios Conde
- Succeeded by: José Ortíz de la Renta

37th Mayor of Ponce, Puerto Rico
- In office 1844 – 24 November 1845
- Preceded by: Bonifacio Martinez de Banos
- Succeeded by: Antonio Corro

Personal details
- Born: 1784 Vilobí d'Onyar, Girona, (Note: Socorro Giron states his tomb in Ponce has an inscription stating he was born in Gerona, Catalonia (Socorro Giron. Ponce, el teatro La Perla y La Campana de la Almudaina. Ponce Municipal Government. 1992. p.31.)) Catalonia
- Died: 24 November 1845 (aged 60–61) Ponce, Puerto Rico
- Spouse: Isabel Diaz
- Children: Carlos
- Profession: Hacendado

Salvador de Vives Rodó (1784 – 24 November 1845), also known as Salvador Vives, was a Puerto Rican hacendado and Mayor of Ponce, Puerto Rico, from 1 January 1840 to 5 January 1842 and then again from 1 January 1844 to 24 November 1845. His son, Carlos Vives, was a member of the Ponce Municipal Assembly.

== Background ==
Vives Rodó was the son of Quirse Vives and Ana Maria Rodó. He was a wealthy coffee plantation owner who established the now historic Hacienda Buena Vista.

== First mayoral term (1840) ==
In 1840, Vives named the two central plazas in downtown Ponce "Plaza Las Delicias"; up to that point the two plazas were called Plaza Mayor (which came to be known as Plaza Degetau) and Paseo de la Alameda (which was later renamed Plaza Munoz Rivera). Also, under Vives' administration as mayor, the Ponce City Hall was built in 1842. De Vives trusted the design of City Hall to prominent architect Francisco Gil Capó. The trees in Plaza Las Delicias are due to De Vives' direction.

== Second mayoral term (1844) ==
Vives also led the city as mayor from 1 January 1844 until his death on 24 November 1845.

== Legacy ==
One of Ponce's main thoroughfares (Calle Vives) is named after him. "The street was named by proclamation of the city council in 1863."

== See also ==
- List of mayors of Ponce, Puerto Rico
- List of Puerto Ricans

== Footnotes ==
Political offices
Preceded by Juan de Dios Conde	Mayor of Ponce, Puerto Rico; 1 January 1840 - 5 January 1842	Succeeded by José Ortíz de la Renta
Preceded by José Ortíz de la Renta	Mayor of Ponce, Puerto Rico; 1844 - 24 November 1845	Succeeded by Antonio Corro
