= Pablo Manfredi =

Interim mayor of Ponce, Puerto Rico

57th Mayor of Ponce, Puerto Rico
- In office 14 February 1854 – 24 July 1854
- Preceded by: Escolástico Fuentes
- Succeeded by: José Benito Paz Falcón

Personal details
- Born: c. 1800
- Died: c. 1860
- Occupation: Farmer

Pablo Manfredi (c. 1800 – c. 1860) was one of five interim mayors of Ponce, Puerto Rico, during the period of 14 February 1854 to 24 July 1854. The other four interim mayors during that six-month period were Julio Duboc, Escolástico Fuentes, José Benito Paz Falcón, and Antonio E. Molina.

== Introduction to politics ==
Manfredi had performed as "4th mayor" under mayor José de Jesús Fernández in the 1846. The position was the result of the new Decreto Orgánico de 1846 (1846 Organic Decree), a new Law for Municipalities that allowed for increased centralization of public administration and greater political control over municipalities. Despite this lack of full political control at the municipal level, the former job allowed Manfredi to gain administrative experience for his work as mayor.

== See also ==
- List of Puerto Ricans
- List of mayors of Ponce, Puerto Rico

Political offices
Preceded by Escolástico Fuentes	Mayor of Ponce, Puerto Rico; 14 February 1854 – 24 July 1854	Succeeded by José Benito Paz Falcón
