= José Ortiz de la Renta =

Former Mayor of Ponce, Puerto Rico

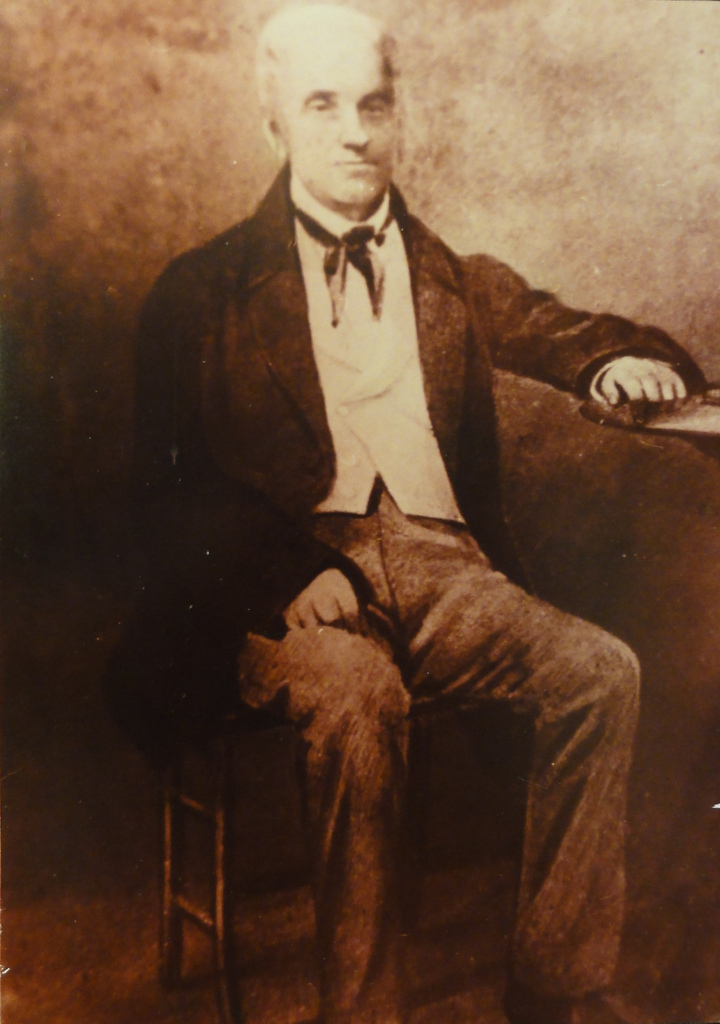
- José Ortiz de la Renta

7th Mayor of Ponce, Puerto Rico
- In office 1812–1814
- Preceded by: José Benítez
- Succeeded by: José de Toro

9th Mayor of Ponce, Puerto Rico
- In office 1815–1816
- Preceded by: José de Toro
- Succeeded by: Alejandro Ordóñez

15th Mayor of Ponce, Puerto Rico
- In office 1820–1821
- Preceded by: José de Toro
- Succeeded by: José Casimiro Ortíz de la Renta

21st Mayor of Ponce, Puerto Rico
- In office 1823–1826
- Preceded by: José Mercado
- Succeeded by: Tomás Pérez Guerra

29th Mayor of Ponce, Puerto Rico
- In office 1837–1838
- Preceded by: Juan de Dios Conde
- Succeeded by: Patricio Colón

33rd Mayor of Ponce, Puerto Rico
- In office 1842–1843
- Preceded by: Salvador de Vives
- Succeeded by: Juan Rondón

35th Mayor of Ponce, Puerto Rico
- In office 1843–1844
- Preceded by: Juan Rondón
- Succeeded by: Bonifacio Martinez de Baños

41st Mayor of Ponce, Puerto Rico
- In office 1846–1846
- Preceded by: Antonio Corro
- Succeeded by: José de Jesús Fernández

Personal details
- Born: ca. 1778 (Note: According to the 1838 Spanish Census, José Ortiz de la Renta y Sánchez, lived in Barrio Bucaná, Ponce, where he had his hacienda in that Census year. According to that Census, he was 60 years old in 1838, which means he was born around 1778. His second wife, Maria de la Cruz Gonzalez de la Renta, lived with him in that year and was 55 years old. His son from his first marriage, Juan Jose Ortiz de la Renta y Podasta, also lived with them. He was 35 years old at the time (thus, born around 1803). He was Teniente de Milicias (army lieutenant) and also an hacendado with his 31-year-old wife, Magdalena Torruella, who was born in Costa Firme (today's Venezuela), and their children, José (3 years old), Rita (2 years old), and Abelino (1 year old).) Ponce, Puerto Rico (Note: Ortiz de la Renta's place of birth does not appear to be known with absolute certainty; Lluch Mora appears to indicate Ortiz de la Renta was born in Ponce, Puerto Rico, whereas Scarano lists him as having been born "in Puerto Rico" without giving a precise town. (See, Francisco Antonio Scarano. Sugar and Slavery in Puerto Rico: The Municipality of Ponce, 1815-1849. Columbia University Ph.D., 1978. p. 443. Published in Ann Arbor, Michigan: University Microfilms International, 1988. (Subsequently published as an independent work on its own right: Sugar and slavery in Puerto Rico : the plantation economy of Ponce, 1800-1850. Francisco A Scarano. Published in Madison, Wisconsin: University of Wisconsin Press. 1984. OCLC 874170682). Given de la Renta's background as "a descendant of the founder of San Germán, on the hills of Santa Marta, next to Río Guanajibo, in 1573," there is some reason to believe he may have been born in San German.)
- Died: ca. 1868 Ponce, Puerto Rico
- Spouse: Estefanía Ortiz de Matos
- Occupation: Hacendado

José Ortiz de la Renta (c. 1765 – c. 1850) was Mayor of Ponce, Puerto Rico, from 1812 to 1814, 1815 to 1816, 1820 to 1821, 1823 to 1826, 1837 to 1838, 1842 to 1843, 1843 to 1844, and in 1846. He has the distinction of having held the office of mayor of Ponce the most — eight times. He was an hacendado.

== Background ==
Like José Casimiro Ortíz de la Renta and Francisco Ortíz de la Renta, José Ortiz de la Renta was a descendant of the founders of San Germán, on the hills of Santa Marta, next to Río Guanajibo, in 1573. He was an hacienda owner and in 1827 owned 16 slaves.

== First mayoral term (1812) ==
As Ponce has had a municipal council since 1812, Mayor Ortiz de la Renta was the first mayor of Ponce with a legislative council. José Ortiz de la Renta was the first alcalde constitutional elected by popular vote, in 1812, as a result of the Constitución de Cádiz (Cádiz Constitution). During his first mayoral term, Ortiz de la Renta was mayor from 1 January 1812 to 31 December 1813. His deputy mayor was Joaquin Mercado, and the regidores in the municipal council were: Juan Gonzalez, Pedro Vazquez, Santiago Suarez, Juan Ramon Quintana, Miguel Ortiz de Mathos, Antonio Ortiz de la Renta, Jose Antonio Collazo, and Clemente del Toro.

== Second mayoral term (1815) ==
During his second mayoral term, Ortiz de la Renta was mayor from 1 January 1815 to 2 January 1816. He led the municipality in the capacity of Teniente a guerra.

== Third mayoral term (1820) ==
During his third mayoral term, Ortiz de la Renta performed again as an alcalde constitucional.

In 1820, the first known division of the Ponce territory into barrios took place. During his third mayoral term, Ortiz de la Renta was mayor from the moment José de Toro left the mayoral administration sometime after 3 June 1820 until 31 December 1820.

Ortiz de la Renta's third mayoral term coincided with Ponce's second ayuntamiento. The ayuntamiento was composed of Ortiz de la Renta as mayor (in the role of Alcalde constitucional); Gregorio Medina (Alcalde segundo); Regidores were: Fernando Gandia, Antonio Algarra, Juan Pablo Aponte, José Pica, Domingo Clavell, Antonio González, Antonio Vazquez Zayas, Juan José Quintana; and Síndicos Procuradores were: Benito Paz Falcón and Esteban Dros.

== Fourth mayoral term (1823) ==
During his forth mayoral term, Ortiz de la Renta performed as alcalde propietario. However, little is known about this period as there are no Acts in the Municipality for the period 1824 to 1834, affecting the period while he was mayor as well.

On 10 March 1823, the barrios of Cayabo and Caonillas, which on that date were still part of the municipality of Ponce, ceased to be part of Ponce and became part of Juana Diaz, and later, in 1917, formed their own municipality, Villalba.

In July 1825, there is a revolt in Ponce by slaves due to the large number of slaves that were up for sale, but the revolt failed. During his fourth mayoral term, Ortiz de la Renta was mayor from 1 January 1823 to 31 December 1825.

== Fifth mayoral term (1837) ==
During his fifth mayoral term, Ortiz de la Renta performed as an alcalde. During this term he was mayor from 1 January 1837 to 31 December 1837.

== Sixth mayoral term (1842) ==
During his sixth mayoral term, Ortiz de la Renta performed as alcalde. During this term, Ortiz de la Renta was mayor from 6 January 1842 to 31 December 1842.

== Seventh mayoral term (1843) ==
During his seventh mayoral term, Ortiz de la Renta performed again as alcalde propietario. During this term, he was mayor from the day when mayor Juan Rondon left city hall in 1843 until 31 December 1843.

== Eighth mayoral term (1846) ==
During his eighth mayoral term, Ortiz de la Renta performed again as alcalde. During this eighth and last mayoral term, he mayored from 1 April 1846 to 30 June 1846.

== Honors ==
Ortiz de la Renta is honored at Ponce's Park of Illustrious Ponce Citizens. Of over 100 Ponce mayors, only six are honored there. In Ponce there is a street in Urbanizacion Las Delicias of Barrio Magueyes named after him.

== See also ==
- List of mayors of Ponce, Puerto Rico
- List of Puerto Ricans

== Notes ==
Political offices
Preceded by José Benítez	Mayor of Ponce, Puerto Rico; 1812-1814	Succeeded by José de Toro
Preceded by José de Toro	Mayor of Ponce, Puerto Rico; 1815-1816	Succeeded by Alejandro Ordóñez
Preceded by José de Toro	Mayor of Ponce, Puerto Rico; 1820-1821	Succeeded by José Casimiro Ortíz de la Renta
Preceded by José Mercado	Mayor of Ponce, Puerto Rico; 1823-1826	Succeeded by Tomás Pérez Guerra
Preceded by Juan de Dios Conde	Mayor of Ponce, Puerto Rico; 1837-1838	Succeeded by Patricio Colón
Preceded by Salvador de Vives	Mayor of Ponce, Puerto Rico; 1842-1843	Succeeded by Juan Rondón
Preceded by Juan Rondón	Mayor of Ponce, Puerto Rico; 1843-1844	Succeeded by Salvador de Vives
Preceded by Antonio Corro	Mayor of Ponce, Puerto Rico; 1846-1846	Succeeded by José de Jesús Fernández
