= Mayor of Ponce, Puerto Rico =

Head of government of Ponce, Puerto Rico

- Flag of the Municipality of Ponce, Puerto Rico
- Incumbent; Marlese Sifre since November 2, 2023
- Municipality of Ponce, Puerto Rico
- Style: Alcalde(sa)
- Seat: City of Ponce, Puerto Rico
- Term length: 4 years (renewable); Via popular vote
- Constituting instrument: Constitution of Puerto Rico
- Formation: 1692
- First holder: Pedro Sánchez de Mathos
- Deputy: Administrador del Municipio (Municipal manager)

The Mayor of Ponce is the head of government of Ponce, Puerto Rico. The current mayor is Marlese Sifre Rodriguez.

== Historical background ==
From 1692 to 1840, the office of mayor (Note: The maximum civil authority in Ponce was not always called "mayor" (or, more precisely, Alcalde). Different names were used including Teniente a guerra, Corregidor, Alcalde mayor, Alcalde ordinario, Justicia mayor, Alcalde constitucional, Alcalde en propiedad, Alcalde real ordinario, and Comandante militar.) in Ponce was filled either by local hacendados or by military officers appointed by the governor, depending on whether the political situation on Spain at the time was that of a constitutional or an absolutist government. From 1840 to 1870, mayors were oftentimes elected by the municipal council, whose members were called regidores. In 1870, political parties were created for the first time and municipal officials were elected by the people at large, and the mayor, as well as the members of the municipal council, would belong to one of the two parties active, either the Partido Liberal Reformista or the Partido Incondicional Español. With the advent of the American political system in Puerto Rico after the American invasion of 1898, the mayor was elected by popular vote, which is the system still (2019) in place.

== First popularly elected mayor ==
Ponce's first (Note: In 2017, Eli D. Oquendo Rodríguez published the findings of his research about Ponce mayors in the period between 1600 and 1799. He states that Pedro Sanchez de Mathos was, in fact, not the first mayor of Ponce and that he may have been mayor much earlier than the 1692 date usually attributed him. Oquendo Rodríguez states that Ponce had at least three other mayors during this period: Don Pedro Martin Rodríguez Valverde (1683-1692), Don Pedro Rodríguez Guzman (1692-1748), and Don Pedro Rodríguez Pacheco (1748-1752). In addition, Don Phelipe de Santiago Pagan (1680, and 1687-1688) and Don Alberto de Rivera y Quiñones [Capitan a Guerra] (1690-1691) were mayors on an interim basis. See Eli D. Oquendo Rodríguez . De Criadero a Partido: Ojeada de la Historia de los Origenes de Ponce, 1645-1810. First Edition. Lajas, Puerto Rico: Centro de Estudios e Investigaciones del Sur Oeste (CEISO). Editorial Akelarre. 2015. ISBN 1516895487. Pages 102-105.) mayor was Don Pedro Sánchez de Mathos, in 1692, appointed by governor Juan Robles de Lorenzana. Ponce elected its first mayor (as well as its first Municipal Assembly) on 20 September 1812. Its first elected mayor was José Ortiz de la Renta, who took office in 1812. Ortiz de la Renta occupied the post of mayor on eight different occasions between 1812 and 1846. In 2008, María "Mayita" Meléndez Altieri, from the New Progressive Party became the first woman elected to the office of mayor by the people of Ponce in its extensive political history. She was also the first mayor of a party other than the Popular Democratic Party in Ponce since 1989, when Rafael "Churumba" Cordero Santiago won the elections and took the oath of office that same year.

== Titles ==
Throughout the centuries, the Ponce municipal heads of government, may have held titles different than the modern title of "Mayor". (Note: Titles differed not only due to changing political conditions in Spain (e.g., constitutional vs. non-constitutional governments) but also due manner how the person came to hold the position (e.g., elected vs appointed by the King vs. appointed by the Provincial Governor vs. appointed by the municipal council or municipal assembly or the political party.).) Some of the other titles held were Teniente a guerra, Corregidor, Alcalde mayor, Alcalde ordinario, Justicia mayor, Alcalde constitucional, Alcalde en propiedad, Alcalde real ordinario, and Comandante militar. Regardless of the different titles held, the people in this position were the maximum civil authority at the municipal level. "Alcaldes" in the Spanish colonial tradition referred to a position attained via election by the regidores (council members) of the municipal council, and refers to someone who had both judicial and administrative functions. "Mayor", on the other hand, refers to a local executive, elected by the people, with administrative functions only.

== 18th century ==
Source: Eduardo Neumann Gandía, Puerto Rico Encyclopedia, and Neysa Rodríguez Deynes.

== Former mayors ==
- 1989–2004: Rafael Cordero Santiago
- 2004–2005: Delis Castillo Rivera de Santiago
- 2005–2009: Francisco Zayas Seijo
- 2009–2021: Mayita Meléndez
- 2021–2023: Luis Irizarry Pabón
- 2023- 2024: Marlese Sifre (interim)
- 2025- present: Marlese Sifre
