= Plaza Muñoz Rivera =

Plaza in the city of Ponce, Puerto Rico

- { Part of Plaza Las Delicias } Formerly, Paseo de La Alameda (ca. 1800s) and Plaza de Las Delicias (1873, 1913)
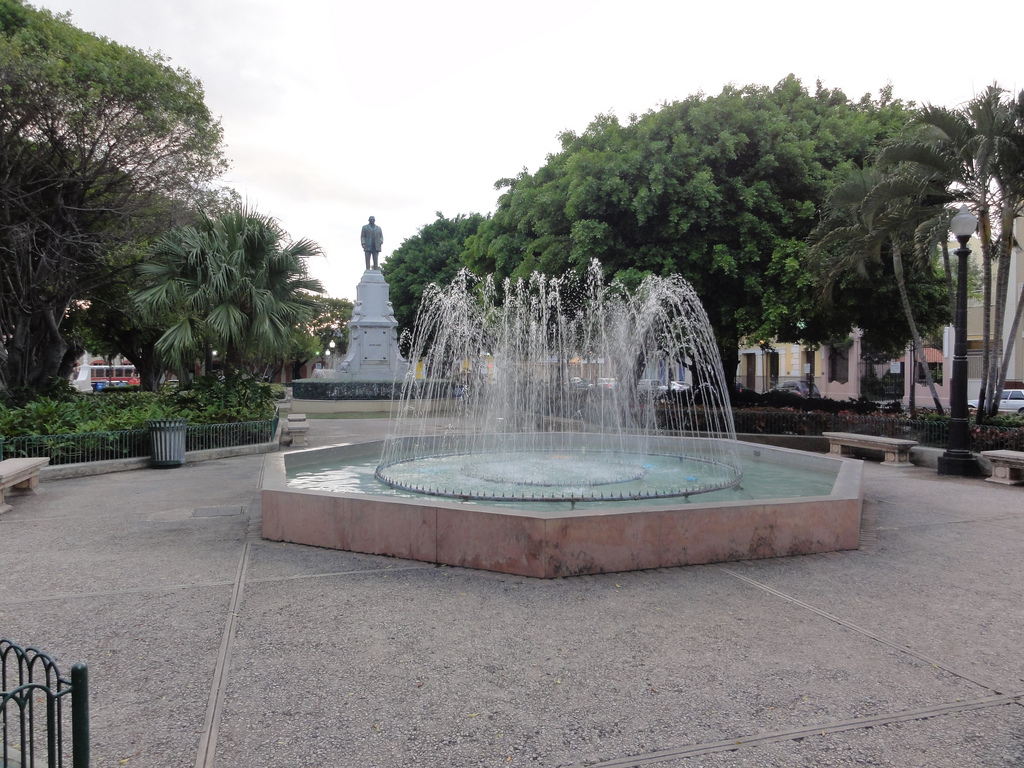
- Plaza Muñoz Rivera in Ponce, Puerto Rico

- Location within Puerto Rico
- Type: Municipal Plaza and Urban park
- Location: Ponce, Puerto Rico
- Coordinates: 18°00′44″N 66°36′51″W
- Area: 2,400 square meters (26,000 ft^{2})
- Created: 1670
- Operator: Autonomous Municipality of Ponce
- Visitors: over 200,000
- Status: Opened all year, 24 hours/day

Plaza Muñoz Rivera, formally Plaza Luis Muñoz Rivera, is the smaller of the two plazas at Plaza Las Delicias in the city of Ponce, Puerto Rico. It is located on the north side of Plaza Las Delicias, north of the larger southern Plaza Degetau. The square is notable for its fountains and for the Luis Muñoz Rivera statue. The historic Parque de Bombas and Ponce Cathedral buildings are located immediately to the south of Plaza Muñoz Rivera. The square is at the center of the Ponce Historic Zone, and is flanked by the Armstrong-Poventud Residence to the west, the Teatro Fox Delicias to the north, and Catholic University of Puerto Rico School of Architecture to the east. The square dates back to the early Spanish settlement in Ponce of 1670. It is the main tourist attraction of the city, receiving about a quarter of a million visitors per year.

== History ==
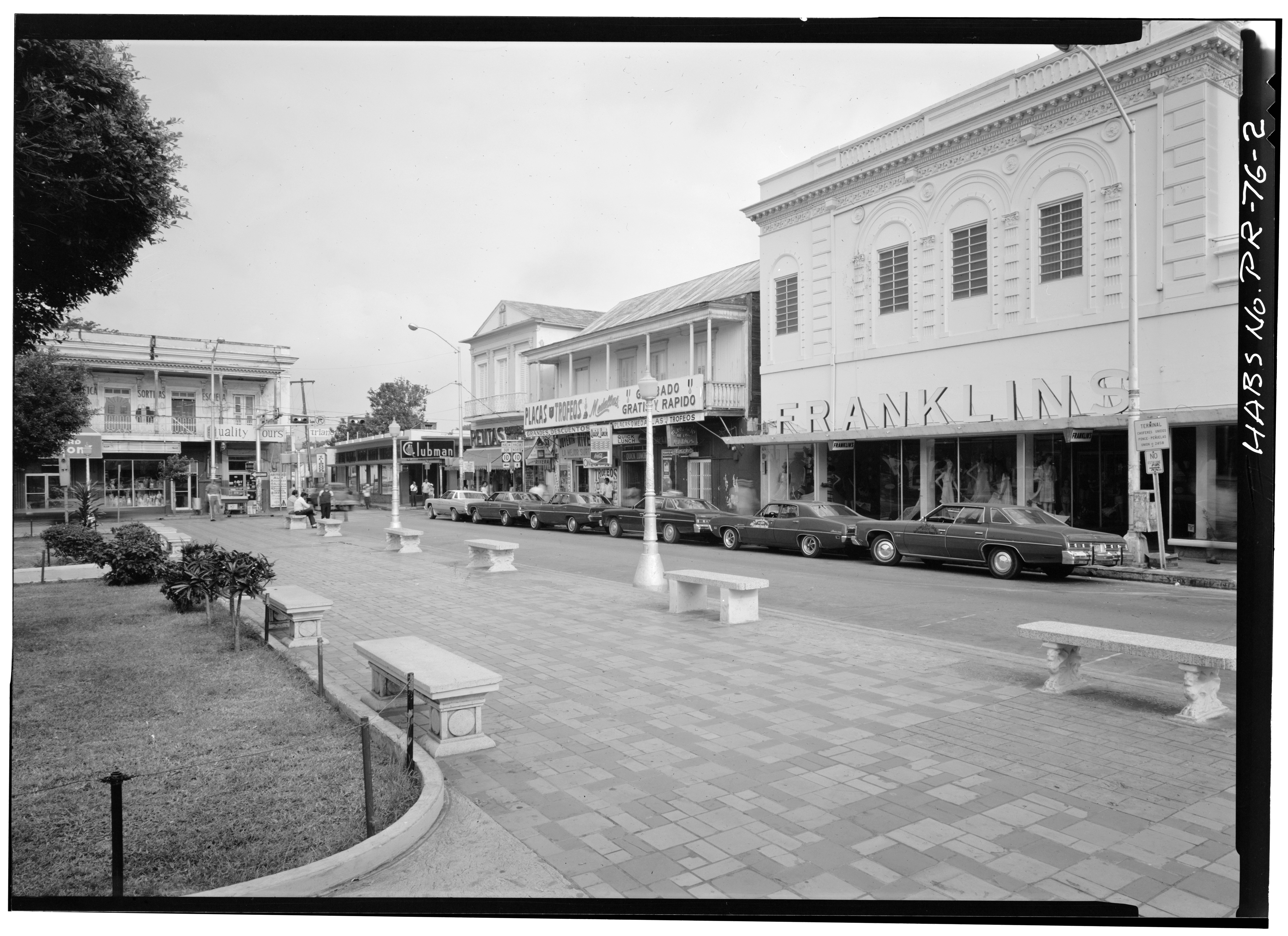
North side of Plaza Muñoz Rivera, looking west-northwest towards the intersection of Calle Reina-Isabel and Calle Union, ca. 1970s

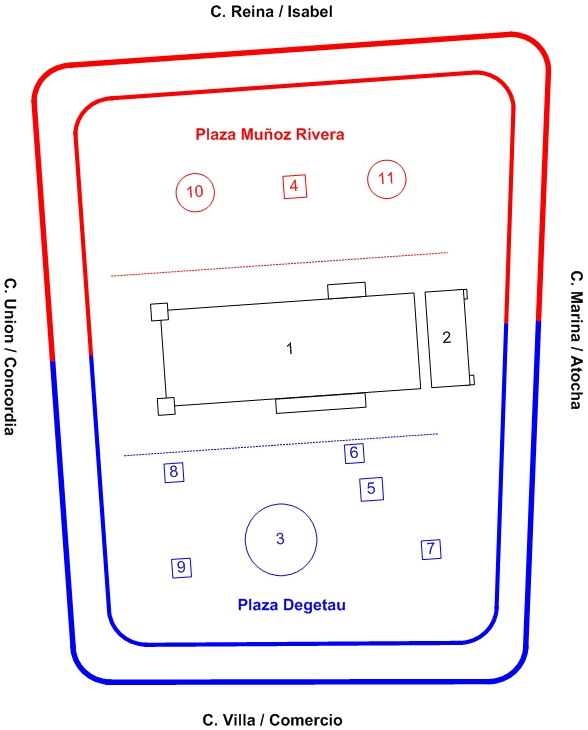
Diagram of Plaza Las Delicias. The upper (north/red) section is the Plaza Luis Muñoz Rivera while the lower (south/blue) section is the Plaza Federico Degetau. Legend: 1. Cathedral Nuestra Señora de la Guadalupe; 2. Parque de Bombas; 3. Lions Fountain; 4. Statue of Luis Muñoz Rivera; 5. Statue of Juan Morel Campos; 6. Statue of Domingo Cruz "Cocolia"; 7. Obelisk to "El Polvorin" Firemen; 8. Statue of Blind Justice; 9. Statue of woman with children, "Añoranzas"; 10 & 11. Large Fountains

According to the traditional Spanish colonial custom, a town's main square, or plaza, was the center of the town. In the case of Ponce, a Catholic church was built on the center of the plaza, thus splitting the plaza into two sections: Plaza Muñoz Rivera to the north (the subject of this article) and Plaza Degetau to the south. Plaza Las Delicias square is, thus, actually made up of two plazas. The north section of the square is named Plaza Luis Muñoz Rivera (Luis Muñoz Rivera square), while the south section is called Plaza Federico Degetau (Federico Degetau square). Plaza Muñoz Rivera measures 2,400 square meters.

The history of the plaza dates back to as far as the creation of the first Catholic chapel in Ponce in 1670. It is also known that around 1840 Mayor Salvador de Vives planted trees as a renovation project for the plaza. It was first lit in 1864. An 1874 map of downtown Ponce shows that this northern plaza (see map/diagram "Diagram of Plaza Las Delicias") was already called "Las Delicias" while the southern plaza (today's Plaza Degetau) continued to be called "Plaza Mayor." When referring to either plaza it is common to just say "Plaza Las Delicias". For example, it may be said that the Feria de Artesanías de Ponce is to take place at Plaza Las Delicias, when in effect it takes place at Plaza Degetau; or to say that Fiestas Patronales are taking place at Plaza Las Delicias when in effect they are centered mostly at Plaza Muñoz Rivera.

== Name ==
Plaza Luis Muñoz Rivera is situated to the north of the Ponce Cathedral and was originally known as Paseo de La Alameda or, simply, Alameda, but today it is named after the famed Puerto Rican statesman Luis Muñoz Rivera. It is so named to honor the prominent poet, journalist, and politician by that name born in Barranquitas and whose statue stands prominently in the center of this plaza. The statue is the product of the foundry of Italian sculptor Luiggi Tomassi in Pietrasanta, Italy. The Muñoz Rivera statue is made in bronze and was unveiled in 1923. Luis Yordán Dávila, mayor of Ponce at the time, was one of the main proponents of the monument. In addition to the statue of Munoz Rivera, this section of Plaza Las Delicias also has two fountains.

== Location ==
Plaza Muñoz Rivera is bounded on the north by Plaza Muñoz Rivera street (also called Reina street and Isabel street), on the west by Union street, on the east by Atocha street, and on the south by the Ponce Cathedral and Parque de Bombas. Two hotels, various banks, several boutiques, and the old 3-story Forenza building (now home to the Pontifical Catholic University of Puerto Rico School of Architecture) surround this plaza. It is surrounded by hotels, banks, the Casa Armstrong-Poventud, the Teatro Fox Delicias, and various boutiques and cafes.

== Setting ==
The plaza has wide mosaic-tile sidewalks, well-manicured flower gardens, well-trimmed bushes and Indian laurel trees, late 1800s lampposts, and numerous marble benches. The fountain is made of marble and bronze.

It is surrounded by a multitude of other historic sites such as Paseo Atocha and the Casa Saurí (now Ponce Ramada Hotel), among others. During the day, the plaza hustles with schoolchildren, shoppers, and tourists. After the sun sets, there are often live bands giving concerts to "multigenerational families."

== Gallery ==
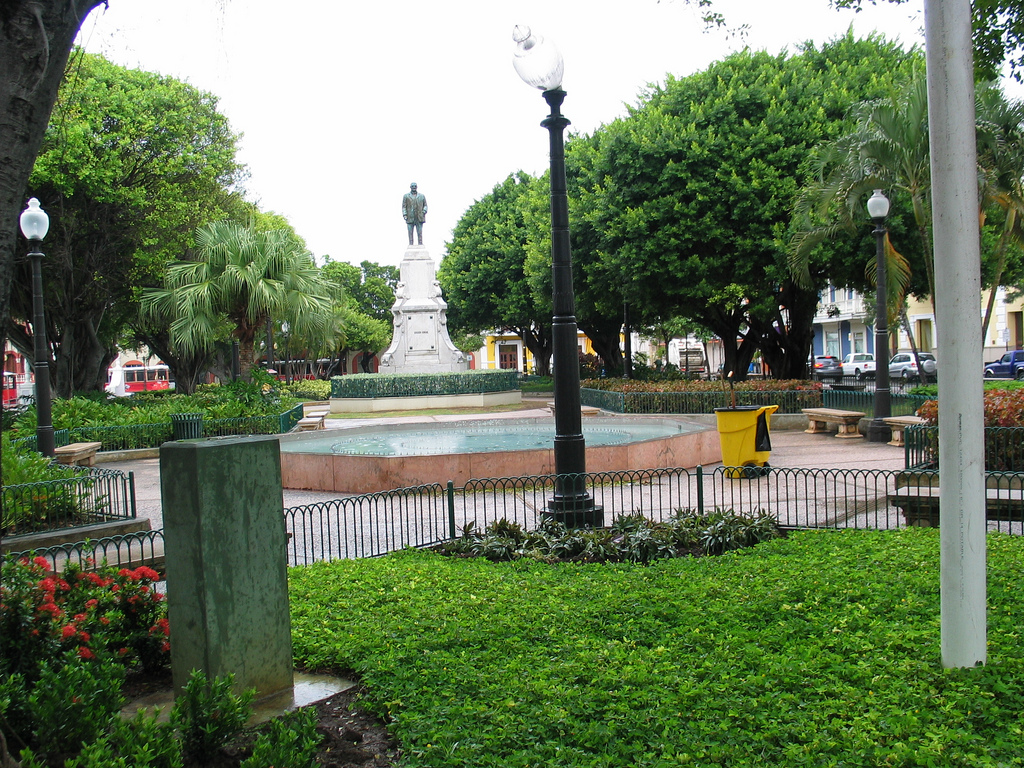
Plaza Muñoz Rivera, looking west, in 2010

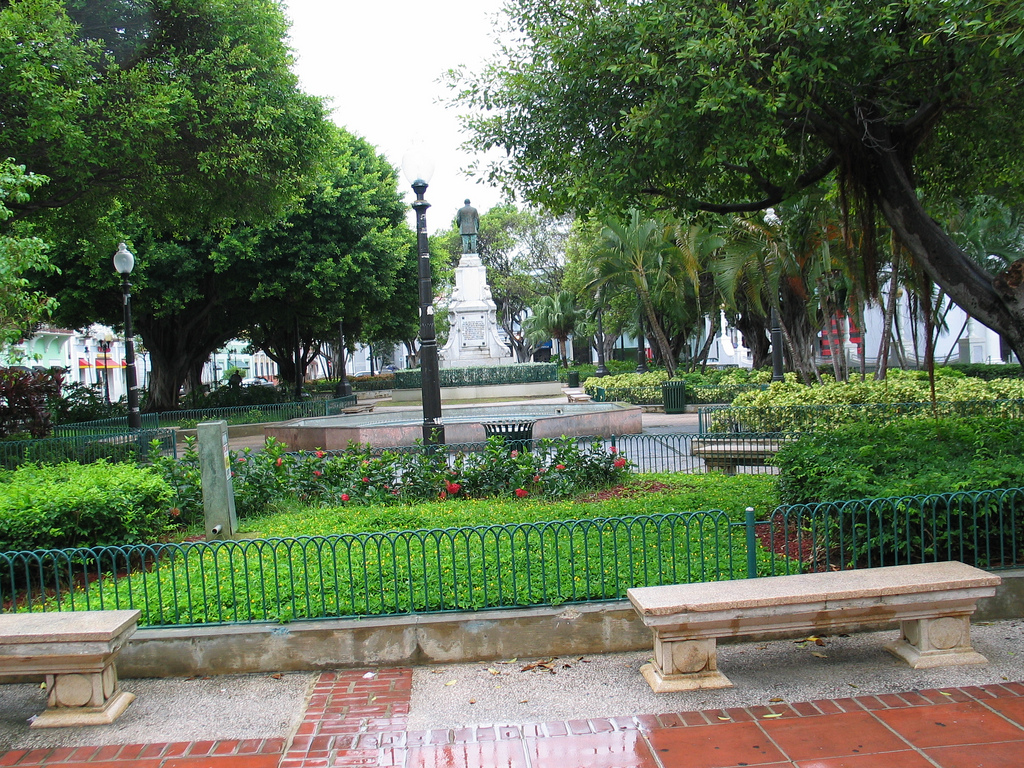
Plaza Muñoz Rivera, looking east, in 2010

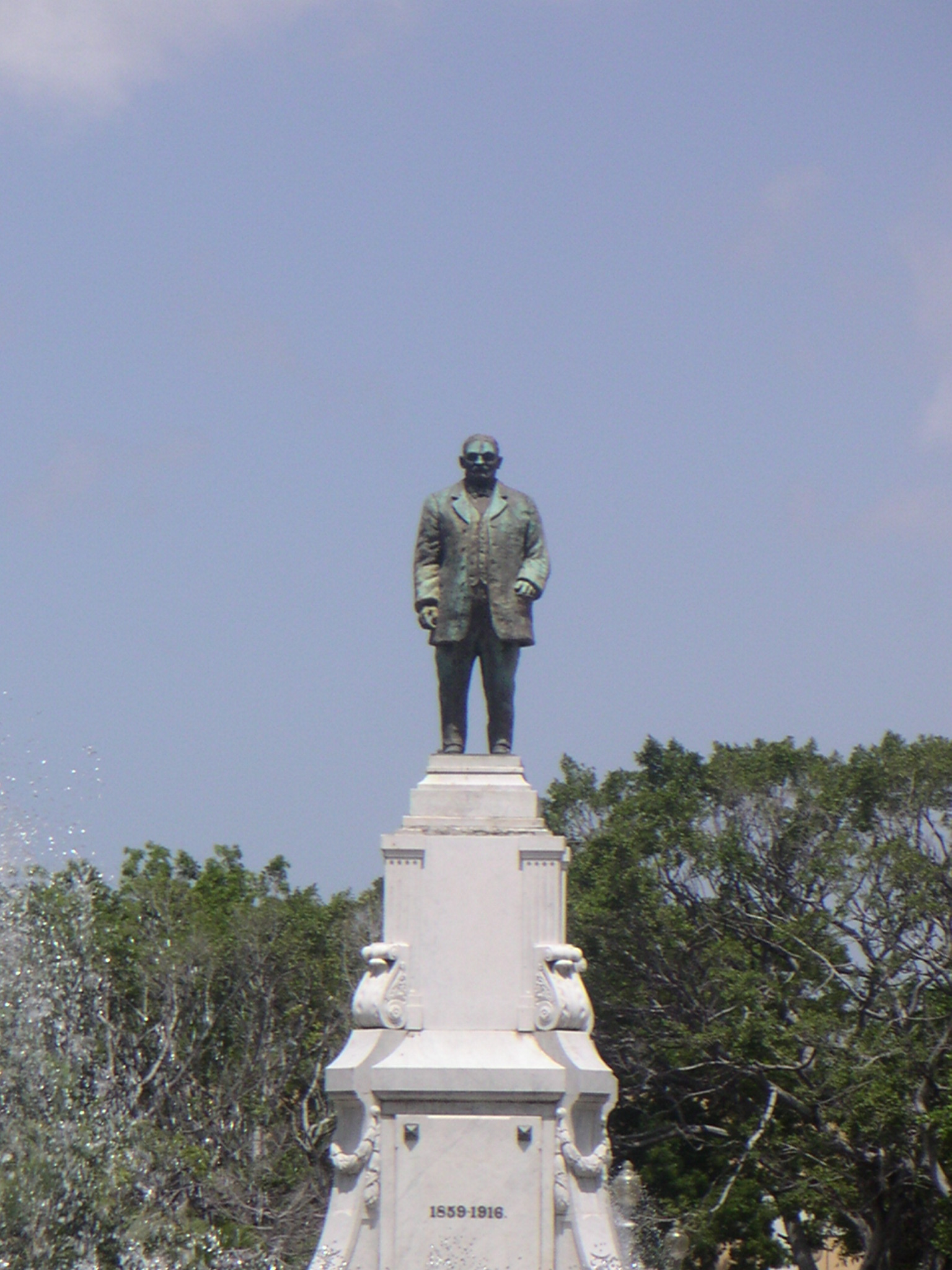
Statue of Luis Munoz Rivera is the centerpiece of Plaza Muñoz Rivera
