= Monumento a los héroes de El Polvorín =

Monumento a los héroes de El Polvorín can refer to:

- Monumento a los héroes de El Polvorín (obelisk), an obelisk at Plaza Las Delicias, Ponce, Puerto Rico
- Monumento a los héroes de El Polvorín (mausoleum), a mausoleum at Ponce Civil Cemetery, in Ponce, Puerto Rico
