= Domingo Cruz (Cocolía) (statue) =

Statue in Ponce, Puerto Rico

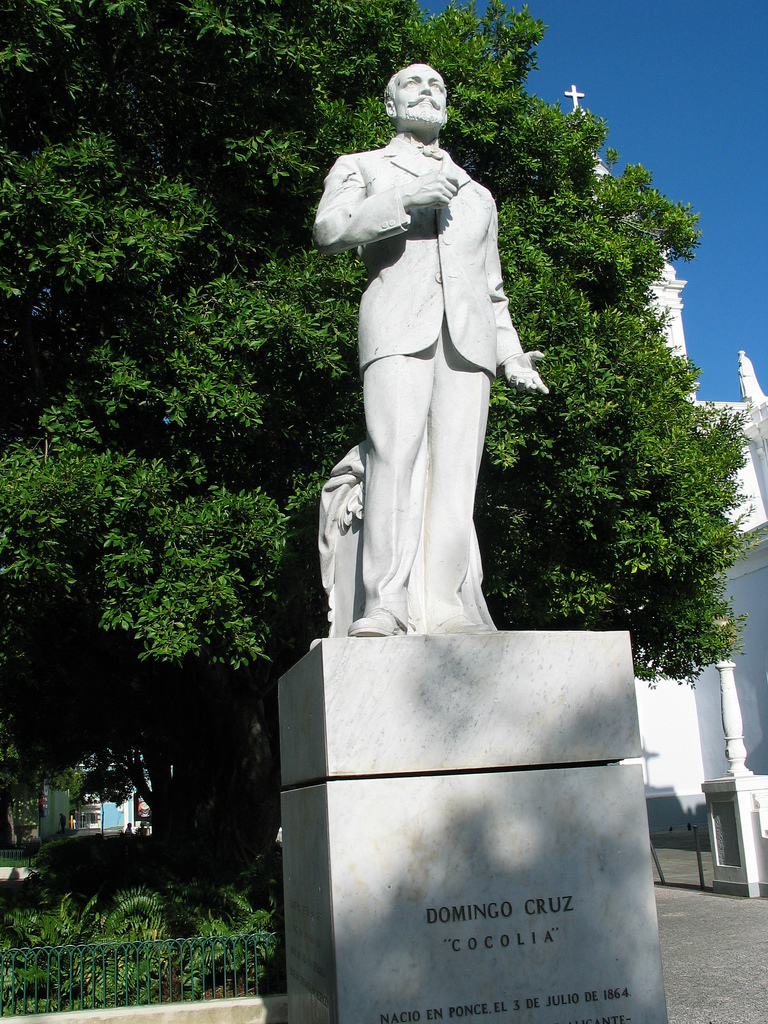

- Location of the statue within Puerto Rico
- Artist: Unknown
- Year: 1926
- Type: Marble
- Movement: Beaux Arts
- Condition: Pristine
- Location: Plaza Degetau Ponce, Puerto Rico; 18°00′41.44″N 66°36′49.86″W
- Owner: Municipality of Ponce, PR

Domingo Cruz (Cocolía) is a statue to the memory of the Puerto Rican musician and Ponce Municipal Band director Domingo Cruz (Cocolía). It is located at Plaza Degetau in Ponce, Puerto Rico. The marble statue also has a marble pedestal.

== Background ==
Domingo Cruz (3 July 1864 – 20 October 1934), a.k.a., "Cocolía", was a late 19th-century Puerto Rican musician, and director of the Ponce Firefighters' Band (now the Ponce Municipal Band). He played the saxhorn with "La Lira Ponceña" orchestra (by 1919 also known as the Ponce Symphony Orchestra) under the baton of Ponce's renowned composer Juan Morel Campos. Famous for his danceable tunes, Cocolía was also a music teacher and director of the Firefighters' Band, the Banda Municipal de Ponce. Upon the death of Juan Morel Campos, he became its director. He directed it from 1896 until 1916.

== Description ==
The statue was lost for many years and was found during the transition to a new governmental administration. It is located just steps the stage where Cocalia and Banda Municipal de Ponce used to play their tunes, at the southern edge of Parque de Bombas. For many years, Cocolia's statue stood in front of the Instituto de Musica Juan Morel Campos, which took over the space previously occupied by downtown Ponce fire station, next to Teatro La Perla. Around 2010 it was moved to Plaza Degetau. It currently (2017) stands at Plaza Degetau.
