= Luis Yordán Dávila =

Puerto Rican politician

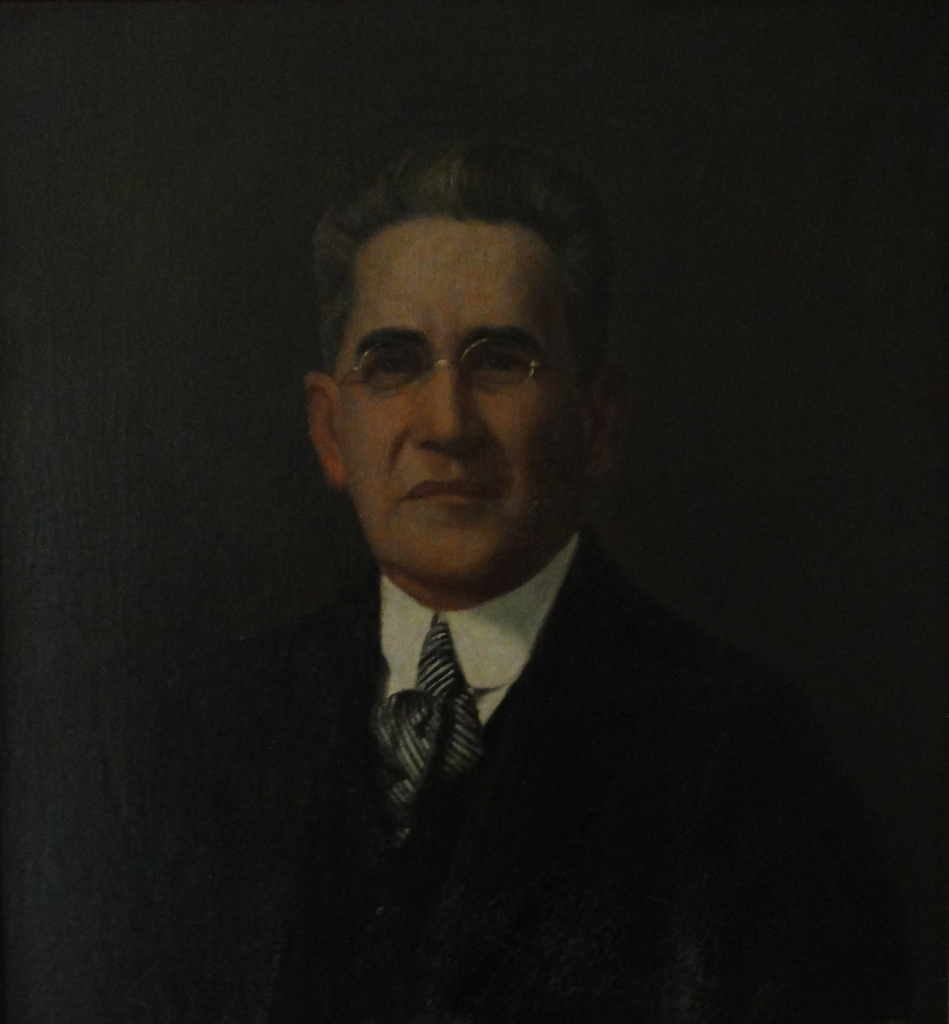
- Mayor Luis Yordán Dávila

114th Mayor of Ponce, Puerto Rico
- In office 1917–1918
- Preceded by: Rafael Rivera Esbrí
- Succeeded by: Rodulfo del Valle

Personal details
- Born: 12 September 1869 Guayanilla, Puerto Rico
- Died: 29 December 1932 Ponce, Puerto Rico
- Spouse: Angela Pasarell Pasarell
- Children: 5
- Profession: Attorney

Luis Leoncio Yordán Dávila (12 September 1869 – 29 December 1932) was an attorney and mayor of Ponce, Puerto Rico, from 1917 to 1918.

== Origin ==
Some sources state Yordan Davila was born in Guayanilla while others state he was born in Ponce. Either way, he appears to have been born on 12 September 1869, the son of Ramon Yordan Gonzalez and Cruz Davila Torres.

== Family life ==
Yordán Dávila married Angela Pasarell Pasarell. Their children were Luis Angel Yordan Pasarell, Rafael A. Yordan Pasarell, Oriol Yordan Pasarell, Belise Yordan Pasarell, and Jorge A. Yordan Pasarell.

== Career ==
Yordán Dávila was a member of the House of Representatives of Puerto Rico. He was also president of the local chapter of the American Red Cross during World War I. He also presided over the committee for the erection of the Luis Munoz Rivera statue on Plaza Las Delicias in Ponce.

In 1905, he was the fiscal commanding officer at the Ponce Firefighters Corps. In 1909, he co-founded the journal La Conciencia Libre (The Free Conscience) in Ponce. From 1910 to 1930, he was a lawyer and public notary. It was during this time that, in 1916, he became mayor of Ponce.

== Mayoral work ==
Yordán Dávila is best known for being one of the main proposers of the bronze statue commemorating prominent poet, journalist, and politician Luis Muñoz Rivera that was eventually built and later (1923) unveiled in the Ponce town square that now bears the name Plaza Muñoz Rivera.

== Death ==
Luis Yordan Davila died on 29 December 1932. He was buried at Cementerio Civil de Ponce in Ponce, Puerto Rico. Luis Fortuño Janeiro said of him, "Ponce lost one of the factors that most enriched its living."

== See also ==
- List of mayors of Ponce, Puerto Rico
- List of Puerto Ricans

Political offices
Preceded by Rafael Rivera Esbrí	Mayor of Ponce, Puerto Rico; 1917–1918	Succeeded by Rodulfo del Valle
