= Los Chinos de Ponce =

Ice cream parlor in Ponce, Puerto Rico

Coordinates: 18°0′41.76″N 66°36′48.49″W

King's Cream "Los Chinos de Ponce"
- Company type: Private
- Industry: Retail
- Founded: 1964; 62 years ago
- Founder: Alfredo Louk and Violeta Chang de Louk
- Headquarters: Ponce, Puerto Rico
- Products: Ice cream
- Number of employees: approx 6

Los Chinos de Ponce (English: "The Chinesemen of Ponce"), formally King's Cream, is an Ice cream parlor located at Calle Marina 9322 in the city of Ponce, Puerto Rico, in front of the town square, Plaza Degetau, opposite the historic Parque de Bombas. Critics have called the site "a Puerto Rican institution" and its ice cream "the Caribbean's best." It has also been called "Puerto Rico's most famous ice cream stand." Another critic called it "[the reason] for which I'll always remember Ponce."

== History ==
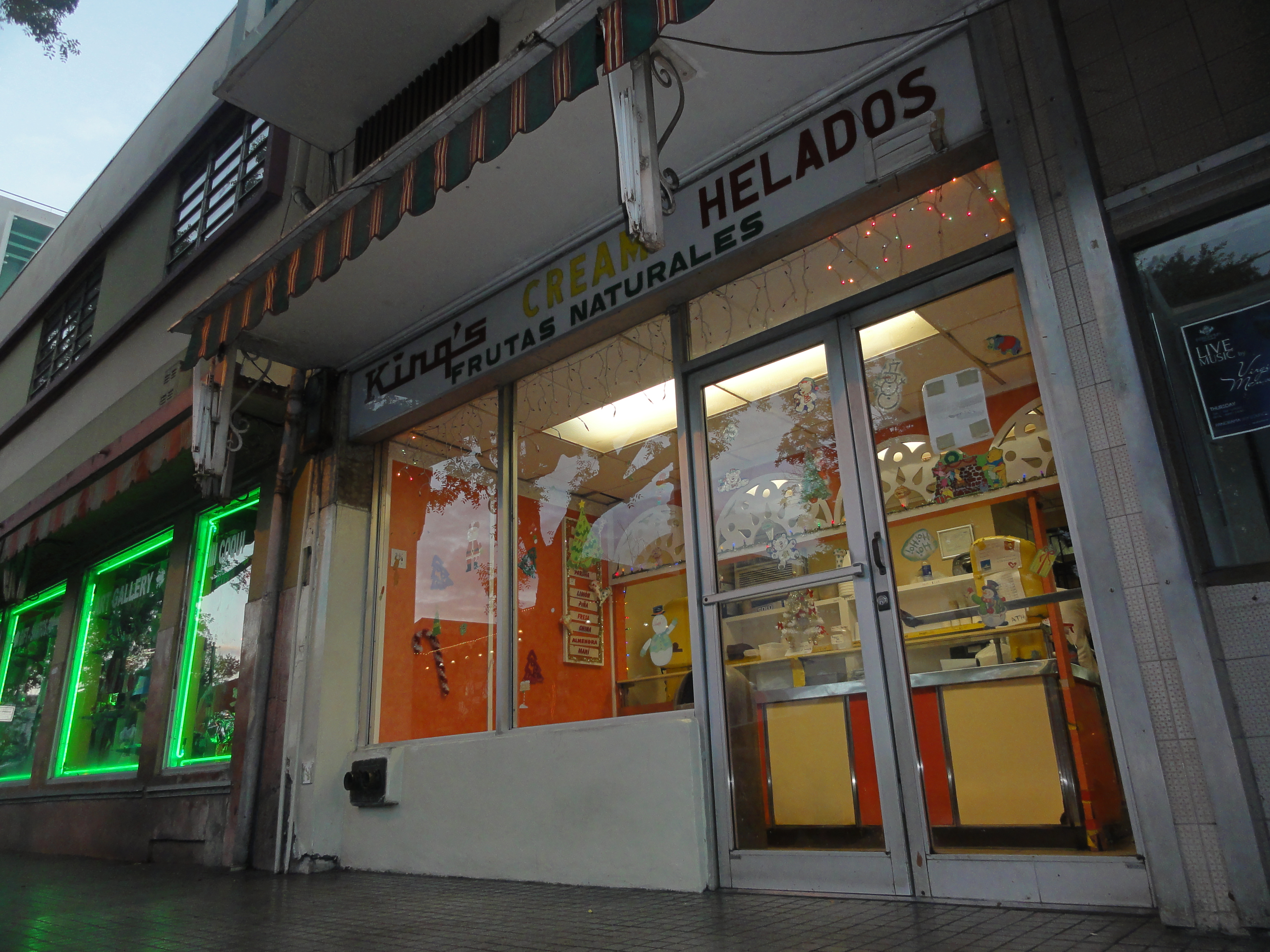
The unassuming King's Cream ice cream parlor, better known as 'Los Chinos de Ponce', across Plaza Degetau on Calle Marina

Their owners/founders were Alfredo Louk, originally from Guangzhou, China (Canton in Spanish), and his wife Violeta Chang de Louk, a Cuban woman of Chinese immigrant parents. The couple had fled the Fidel Castro government and established themselves in Ponce in 1963.

They opened the first King's Cream store in 1964. It was located at 61 Calle Vives, between Calle Union and Calle Atocha. A second outlet of the same company opened three blocks away across Plaza Las Delicias on Calle Marina a few years later.

== Offering ==
The store has an array of local flavors, including pineapple, parcha (passion fruit), coconut, guanabana (soursop), tamarind, acerola, peanut, maize, and almond in addition to the traditional vanilla and chocolate flavors.

== See also ==
- List of Puerto Rico Landmarks
- Chinese immigration to Puerto Rico
- Piragua
