= Calle 25 de Enero =

Historic street in Ponce, Puerto Rico

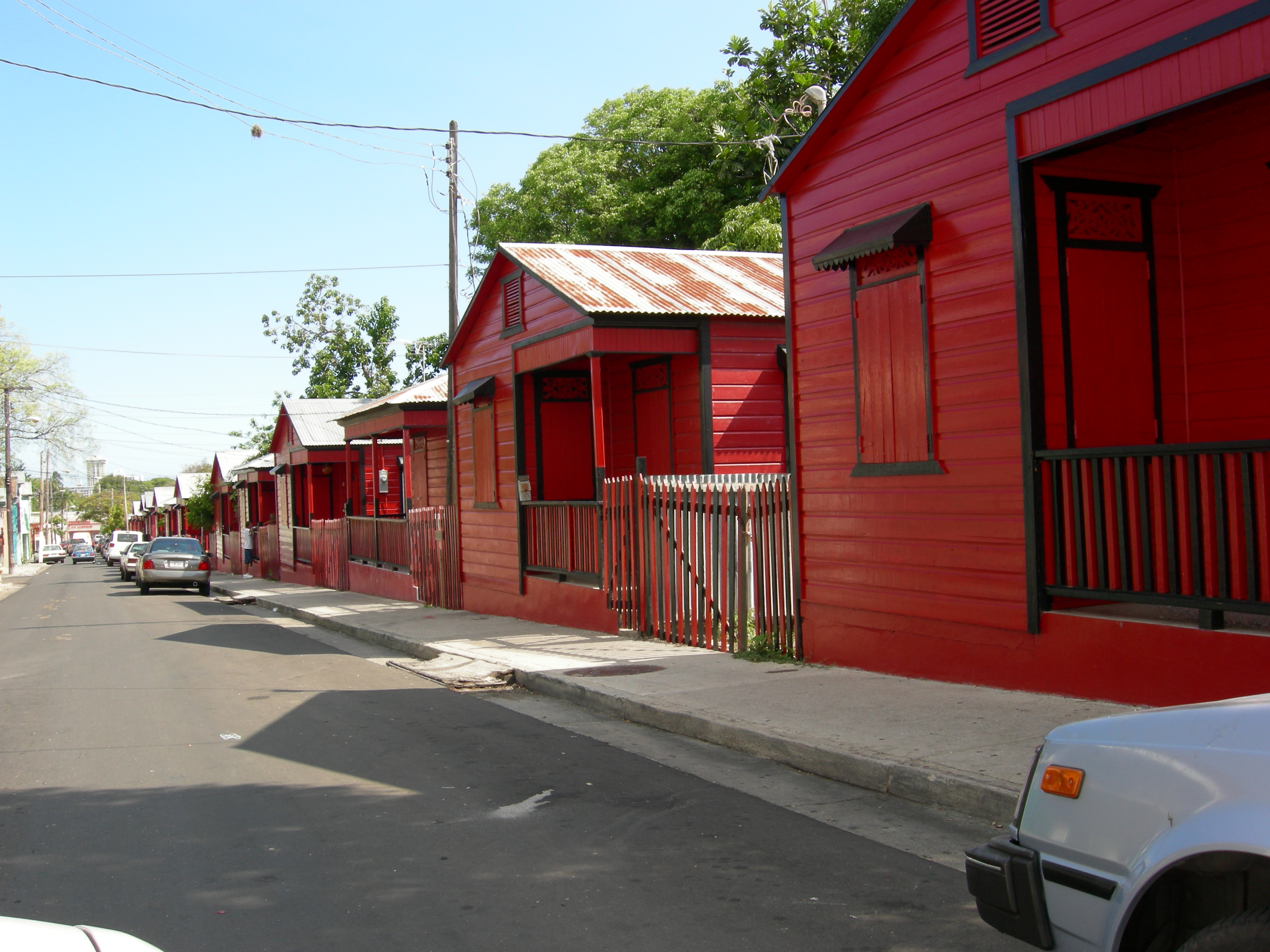
- Calle 25 de Enero, in May 2006
- Interactive map of the Calle 25 de Enero area

General information
- Type: Victorian houses
- Architectural style: Ponce Creole
- Location: Barrio Segundo, Ponce, Puerto Rico
- Coordinates: 18.0133°N 66.6226°W
- Construction started: 30 May 1906

Design and construction
- Architect: City of Ponce architects

Calle 25 de Enero (lit., 25 January Street) is a street and historic Victorian block located in barrio Segundo in Ponce, Puerto Rico, built to house Ponce's volunteer firemen and their families, after the historic fire that took place in the city on 25 January 1899, in appreciation for their labor on that fateful day.

This picturesque street is lined with 39 red-striped and black-striped houses, the local firefighters' colors. The street takes its name from the historic fire that took place in the town on that day in 1899. Since then, and for a number of years, the city of Ponce built new homes on this street and then drew lots to see which of its firemen would be the lucky owners of these free new properties.

== History ==
As a result of the devastating fires that have regularly swept through the city, firefighters are a particularly revered group in Ponce. But it was the fire on 25 January 1899, known as El Polvorín, that is perhaps the most famous. It started in a military munition depot, located just three blocks from the now also historic Parque de Bombas firehouse, yet the firefighters were told not to fight the fire. The reason for the order is not really known but what is certain is that several firemen decided to disobey orders, extinguishing the fire and saving the town. Although they were initially in danger of being punished for insubordination, the people of Ponce considered them heroes and there was an enormous public outcry when they were jailed for disobedience. Eventually, the U.S. military government in Ponce rethought its decision, freed the men and the city honored them in a public celebration.

For years the city wanted to do something more than just recognize and honor the firefighters' wisdom and courage. So seven years later, and starting on 30 May 1906, the City put together a system whereby these firefighters and their families would be provided with free housing.

The firefighters of the city had always been volunteers and the municipal government decided to recognize their courage and importance by selecting a firefighter each year to receive a new home. These houses were constructed by the government and the official name of the street where they were built was eventually changed to 25 de Enero Street, "the 25th of January Street", in honor of those firefighters who saved the city in 1899. The houses, which today number about 60, are easily spotted. They are painted in the distinctive red and black colors of Ponce.

== Today ==
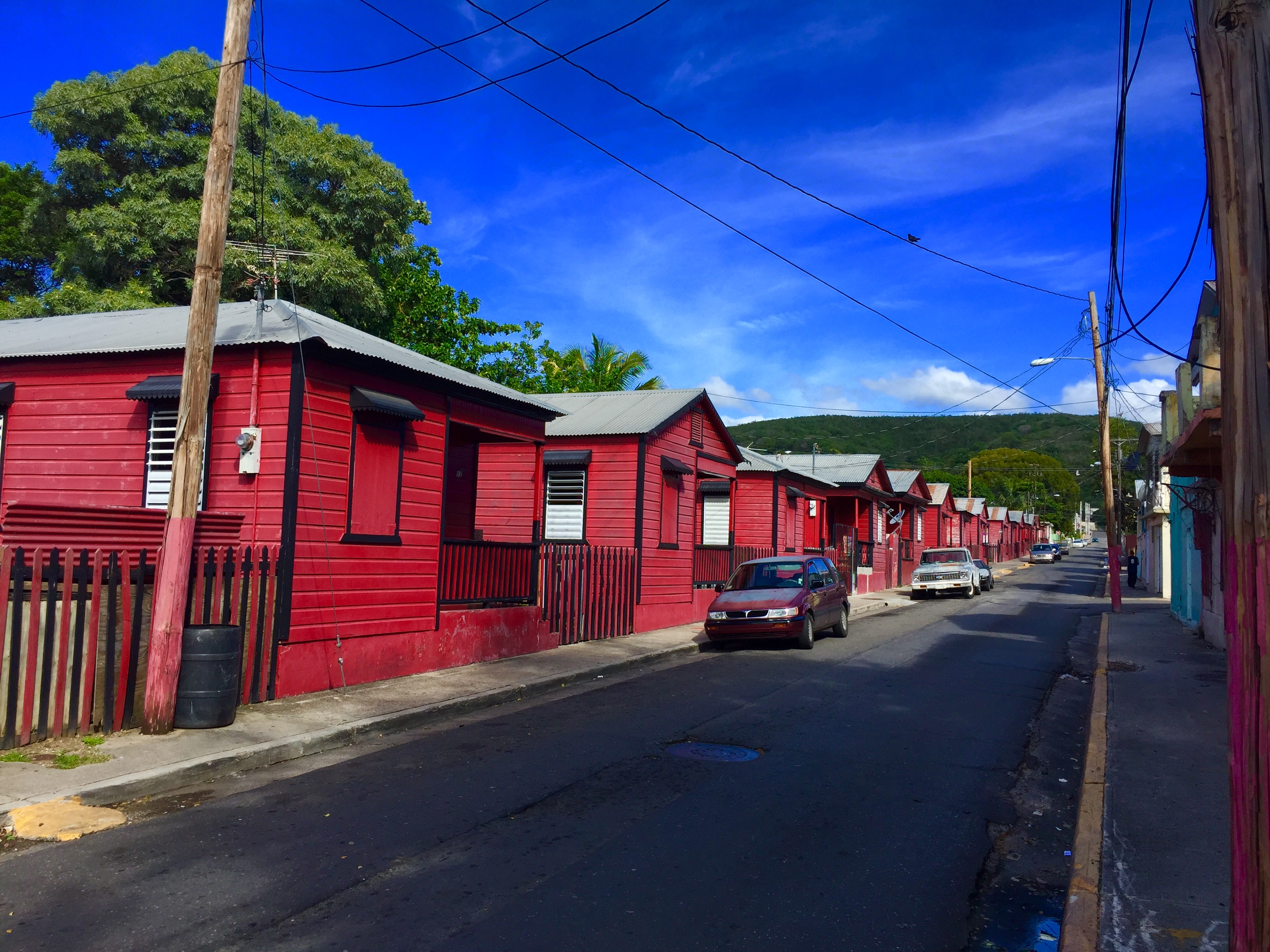
25 de Enero Street. 2015.

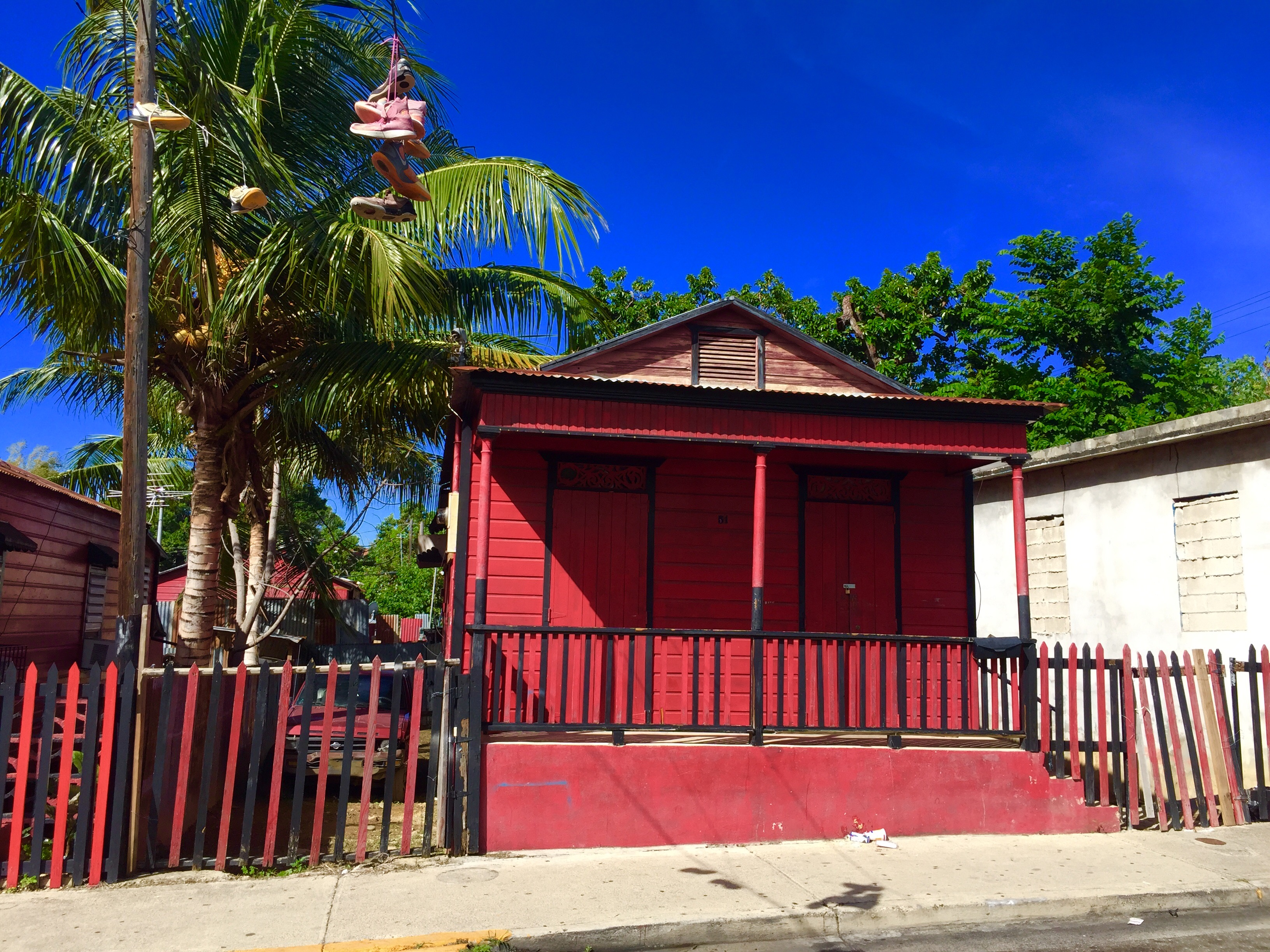
A house on 25 de Enero Street. 2015.

The houses, the street and its surrounding areas were restored in 1991 under mayor Rafael Cordero Santiago as part of the city's efforts to "rescue" its history.

Starting in the early twentieth century, the site of the El Polvorin fire saw the construction of what became Ponce High School. The school, still functioning today, is a complex of seven buildings and is listed in the National Register of Historic Places.

Ponce is the only town in Puerto Rico that has officially declared a group of citizens as "heroes". The date of the twenty-fifth of January is, after the date of the founding of the city (1692), the second most important date in the municipality of Ponce. The seven heroes where: Rafael Rivera Esbri (who later became mayor of the municipality), Juan Romero, Rafael del Valle y Valle, Cayetano Casals, Pedro Sabater, Gregorio Rivera, Pedro Ruiz y Tomás Rivera. The heroes proclamation was made via a legislative action and was exhibited at the Parque de Bombas museum. Regrettably, it disappeared from the museum while it was being restored during the years 1969 to 1972.

In gratitude for their work, every 25 January the municipality of Ponce places a wreath of flowers and performs other activities to commemorate the daring labor of these heroes during the fateful "El Polvorin" fire. The city also has a marble obelisk prominently displayed on its main square, Plaza Federico Degetau, to honor the memory of the heroes of "El Polvorin". The obelisk was erected by a city board consisting of Jaime L. Drew, Antonio Arias, and Antonio Mirabal. It was built in 1958, thus replacing the original obelisk built shortly after the 25 January 1899 fire which was destroyed by the 1918 San Fermín earthquake. Ponce firefighters have another memorial at Cementerio Civil de Ponce: the Monument to the El Polvorin Heroes, where the remains of the seven heroes are buried. Ponce firefighters since those first seven heroes have been eligible to be laid to rest at this tomb-monument, and many have been laid there.

== In popular culture ==
A composition by Banda Municipal de Ponce director Rubén Colón Tarrats was made about this street.

== See also ==
- List of streets in Ponce, Puerto Rico
