= Monumento a los héroes de El Polvorín (obelisk) =

Monument at Plaza Las Delicias in Ponce, Puerto Rico

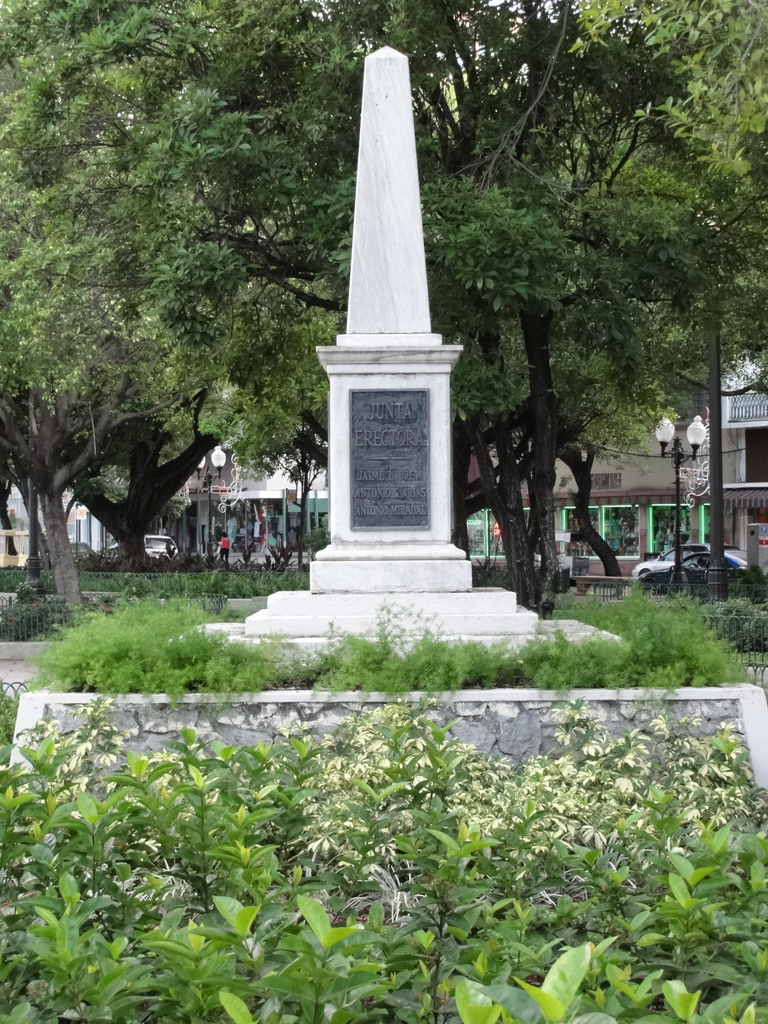
- Image of the monument
- Interactive map of Monumento a los héroes de El Polvorín
- Location: Plaza Degetau at Plaza Las Delicias, Ponce, Puerto Rico
- Coordinates: 18.011503°N 66.613846°W
- Type: Obelisk
- Material: Granite and Marble
- Height: approx 20 feet
- Beginning date: ca. 1947
- Completion date: 1948
- Opening date: 25 January 1948
- Dedicated to: The "El Polvorin" fire heroes

The Monumento a los héroes de El Polvorín (Monument to the "El Polvorín" fire heroes) is a monument at Plaza Las Delicias in Ponce, Puerto Rico, dedicated to the seven fire fighters and one civilian that subdued the flames of the "El Polvorin" fire on the night of 25 January 1899.

== Location ==
The monument is located in a shady area on the eastern half of Plaza Degetau, the southern plaza at Plaza Las Delicias in Ponce, Puerto Rico, and it honors the following seven firemen and one civilian:

- Rafael Rivera Esbrí (civilian)
- Pedro Sabater (2nd Corporal)
- Rafael del Valle (1st Corporal)
- Cayetano Casals (2nd Corporal)
- Pedro Ruiz (1st Sargent)
- Juan Romero (1st Corporal)
- Gregorio Rivera (Gastador)
- Tomas Rivera (2nd Corporal)

Its coordinates are 18.011503°N 66.613846°W (18°00′41″N 66°36′50″W).

== Background ==
On 25 January 1899, a large fire (later dubbed "El Polvorin") threatened the lives of the residents of the city of Ponce and, given Ponce's de facto role as Puerto Rico's banking and agricultural capital, it threatened the economy of Puerto Rico as a whole. The fire started at the horse barn of the recently deployed U.S. Army artillery encampment one block from the center of town, on Calle Salud between Calle Cristina and Calle Comercio, and quickly spread towards the army's artillery munitions storage area. By the time the local commander realized there was a fire near the munitions compound, he judged it too risky for his men to try to put it out and ordered all personnel to move away from the area to let the fire extinguish itself, even if it meant explosions at the munitions depot. The commander also instructed the local firemen (then numbering about 40) not to enter the area or attempt to extinguish the fire. However, seven of the firemen and one civilian disobeyed the orders of the commander and decided to fight the fire. They were able to suppress the fire before it could get to the gunpowder reserves, without any loss of life or additional loss of property. Due to their efforts, disaster upon the then mostly wooden homes and businesses in town was averted. For their success, the group was honored many times both in Ponce and the rest of Puerto Rico. The obelisk was built to honor their memory.

== The structure ==
The obelisk was built in 1948. It replaced the original obelisk built shortly after the 25 January 1899 fire, but which was destroyed by the 1918 San Fermín earthquake. The obelisk was erected by a city board consisting of Jaime L. Drew, Antonio Arias, and Antonio Mirabal. This monument is different from the obelisk/tomb built in 1911, and dedicated to the same men, and which stands at the Cementerio Civil de Ponce (Ponce Civil Cemetery).

The four-sided obelisk has four plaques, one on each side.

The plaque facing East reads:

"Tributo de Gratitud que el pueblo de Ponce dedica en el 49o aniversario del acaecimiento, a sus ocho benemeritos hijos quienes, con expocision de sus vidas, conjuraron el voraz elemento. 25 de enero de 1948."	"Tribute of Gratitude which the people of Ponce dedicate on the 49th anniversary of its occurrence to its eight distinguished citizens who, exposing their own lives, fought the raging fire. 25 January 1948."

The North-facing plaque lists the honored men, saying:

"Heroes de la Jornada Rafael Rivera Esbri (civil) (Note: The civilian Rafael Rivera Esbrí later became a mayor of Ponce.) Pedro Sabater Rafael del Valle Cayetano Casals Pedro Ruiz Juan Romero Gregorio Rivera Tomas Rivera."	"Heroes of the Labor Rafael Rivera Esbri (civilian) Pedro Sabater Rafael del Valle Cayetano Casals Pedro Ruiz Juan Romero Gregorio Rivera Tomas Rivera."

The Western-facing plaque says:

"El siniestro al que se hace referencia se desarrollo en el lugar en que se levanta la Escuela Rosevelt, manzana que circuyen la calles Comercio, Salud, Cristina, Trujillo."	"The disaster to which we make reference occurred at the location of Roosevelt School, (Note: The "Roosevelt School", mentioned on the Western facing plaque, refers to the Ponce High School.) the block bordered by Comercio, Salud, Cristina and Trujillo streets."

The plaque facing South reads:

"Junta Erectora: Jaime L. Drew Antonio Arias Antonio Mirabal"	"Building Board: Jaime L. Drew Antonio Arias Antonio Mirabal"
