= Antonio Mirabal (poet) =

Puerto Rican writer and historian

Antonio Mirabal González
- Born: 1880; Ponce, Puerto Rico
- Died: 1966; Ponce, Puerto Rico
- Occupations: Historian; poet; writer

Antonio Mirabal González (1880–1966 (Note: Fay Fowlie de Flores states he was born in 1888 and died in 1971. (See Fay Fowlie de Flores's Ponce, Perla del Sur: Una Bibliográfica Anotada. Second Edition. 1997. Ponce, Puerto Rico: Universidad de Puerto Rico en Ponce. p. 111. Item 568. LCCN 92-75480 ))) was a Puerto Rican poet, writer, and historian.

== Early life ==
Mirabal González was born in Ponce, Puerto Rico, in 1880. His parents were Juan Nepomuceno Mirabal and Rosa de Lima González.

== Career ==
During the early part of the 20th century Mirabal González wrote poetry much of which was published in the El Dia newspaper, Puerto Rico's main daily at the time. He was a young 18-year-old man when the United States invaded his homeland and later in his life he wrote several articles on the subject. Subsequently, Mirabal became chief archivist at the Archivo Histórico de Ponce (Ponce Historical Archive), a position he held until 1966. He was also a political activist following closely the political developments in Puerto Rico as illustrated in his "Ponce y los partidos politicos de Puerto Rico." There he also describes the formation of the Puerto Rican Republican Party.

In 1948, and together with Antonio S. Arias Ventura and Jaime L. Drew, Mirabal was one of three municipal board members entrusted with erecting the obelisk monument at Plaza Degetau to honor the men who fought the "El Polvorin" fire of 25 January 1899.

== Works ==
Among his works are:

- De Rosas a Trujillo : estudio histórico comparativo de las tiranías en América. A Book published by Editorial Hostos, (San Juan, Puerto Rico) in 1937.
- De tu rosal y mi selva. A Book of Poetry published in Ponce, Puerto Rico by "El Día Press" in 1917.
- Alas y olas : (poesías). A Book of Poetry published in Ponce, Puerto Rico by "El Día Press" in 1922.
- Daniel de Rivera (apología). Published in Ponce, Puerto Rico by Tip. Camacho, Sucesores in 1945.
- Daniel de Rivera (apología). A conference presented at the Ateneo Puertorriqueño, San Juan, Puerto Rico, on 30 January 1945. An introductory speech by the president of the Atheneum, Don Miguel Meléndez Muñoz. Published by Camacho Publishers, Ponce, Puerto Rico, in 1945.
- Ponce y los partidos politicos de Puerto Rico. An article in the newspaper "El Dia" published in 1949.
- La invasion norteamericana en Ponce. An article in El Dia newspaper published in 1949.

== Honors and recognitions ==
He is recognized at Ponce's Park of Illustrious Ponce Citizens.

== See also ==
- Ponce, Puerto Rico
- List of Puerto Ricans
