= Herminia Tormes García =

Puerto Rican lawyer

- Born: 19 October 1891; Ponce, Puerto Rico
- Died: 7 November 1964 (aged 73); Ponce, Puerto Rico
- Other names: Herminia Tormes de Lanausse; Herminia Tormes de Beauchamp
- Occupation: lawyer
- Years active: 1917–1964

Herminia Tormes García (19 October 1891 – 7 November 1964) was a Puerto Rican lawyer and the first woman to practice the profession on the island. After earning the right to practice law in 1917, she became the first woman to bring a case before the Bostonian jurisdiction of the United States Court of Appeals in 1924. In 1926, she was appointed as the first woman to serve as a judge in Puerto Rico. Throughout her career, Tormes worked for women who were incarcerated or engaged in prostitution, advocating for their rights. In 1964, the Bar Association of Puerto Rico named a room after her at its offices in San Juan.

== Early life ==
Herminia Tormes García was born on 19 October 1891 in Ponce in the Spanish colony of Puerto Rico to Ana Jacobina García Esclabón and Joaquín Tormes Carbo. Her father was of Spanish heritage and her mother was an Afro-Puerto Rican woman who had formerly been a slave. After graduating from high school in Ponce, Tormes earned a degree to teach English from the Normal School of the University of Puerto Rico. She first married Leopoldo Simón Lanausse y Belfrey, with whom she had a son Cárlos Servando Lanausse y Tormes in 1914. In 1917, she graduated in the second class of students to have completed their education at the University of Puerto Rico School of Law. She took her oath on 6 December 1917, becoming the first woman eligible to practice law in Puerto Rico and two weeks later, in the District Court of Ponce on 21 December 1917 divorced Lanausse.

== Career ==
Tormes and her brother Leopoldo, also an attorney, worked together, often defending the rights of marginalized women. In 1918, in the city of Ponce, an anti-prostitution campaign began and hundreds of women were arrested and charged as prostitutes. The campaign targeted any women who had engaged in sexual activity without being married, regardless of whether they were selling sex. Unfounded accusations could result in women being accused and undergoing invasive physical examinations to prove their innocence. Their male partners were not charged with crimes and women convicted of prostitution had no means to appeal the decisions. By August, the campaign was island-wide and the Tormes siblings, along with Rafael Martínez Nadal, organized a demonstration to protest the violation of women's human rights. The siblings organized their clients, filing appeals and petitions for pardon, and pressed for hearings for women, alleging that the state was in violation of their clients' civil liberties. Tormes also provided press releases to the local media, pleading on behalf of the women. Leopoldo was accused of subverting the war efforts because of his vigorous defense of women's rights, but the pressure of numerous lawsuits and media coverage caused the government to suspend mass arrests.

The jails of Arecibo and Ponce were converted to hospitals for "wayward women" and began to treat women with venereal disease and provide training to rehabilitate them, providing them with skills that enabled them to earn a living upon release. Tormes headed the efforts to rehabilitate the women and stressed the importance of providing them with education and marketable skills. At the end of World War I, she founded a school with Moisés Echevarría to offer vocational training to inmates, refusing to call the women prostitutes. She rallied local teachers to volunteer with the inmates and teach the prisoners to read and write, while simultaneously pressing the government to appoint a full-time teacher for them. She organized networks of businesses willing to offer women work after their incarceration, recognizing that prostitution was a symptom of the women's poverty and illiteracy. After successfully convincing the department of education to provide teachers for women prisoners, Tormes pressed the Council of National Defense to implement economic development projects for the entire island.

In 1924, Tormes became the first woman in the First Circuit of the U.S. Court of Appeals to argue a case and was the first woman licensed to practice in the Appellate Court of Boston. Between 1926 and 1941, Tormes served as the municipal judge in the municipality of Juana Díaz. With her appointment, she became the first woman judge of Puerto Rico and in 1929 became a district judge in Juana Díaz, serving also in the courts of Coamo, San Sebastián and Vega Baja. On 13 October 1930, Tormes married Guillermo Beauchamp Quiñones, and the following year, the couple had a son, Guillermo Anthony Beauchamp Tormes. She practiced law for over forty years, retiring after she was diagnosed with cancer in 1963.

== Death and legacy ==
Tormes died from cancer in Ponce on 7 November 1964, and was buried at the Cementerio Civil de Ponce. In 1964, the Bar Association of Puerto Rico named a room after her at its offices in San Juan. She is remembered for her role in championing law as a profession for Puerto Rican women. In 2013, the Bar Association hosted an exhibit for Lawyer's week, In Memoriam, which included Tormes, to honor the prominent Puerto Rican jurists who had been instrumental in developing the country's equal access to justice.
