= Rafael Rivera Esbrí =

Puerto Rican politician

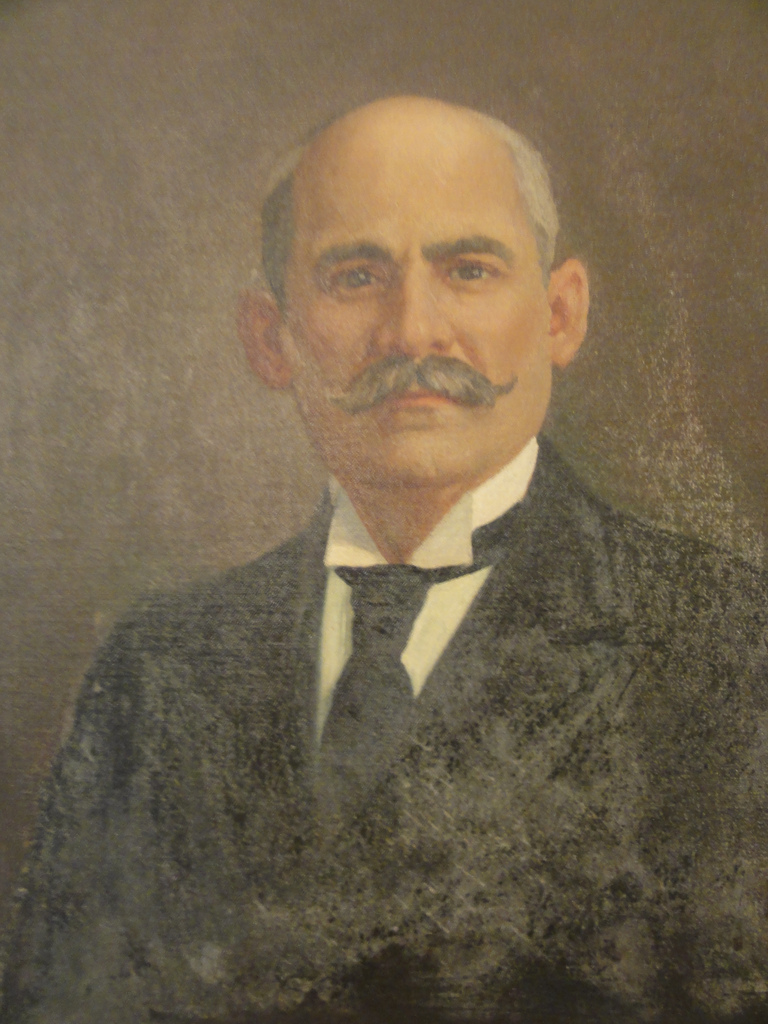
- Mayor Rafael Rivera Esbrí

113th Mayor of Ponce, Puerto Rico
- In office 2 January 1915 – 2 January 1917
- Preceded by: Simón Moret Gallart
- Succeeded by: Luis Yordán Dávila

Personal details
- Born: 2 July 1870 Ponce, Puerto Rico
- Died: 9 November 1965 (aged 95) Ponce, Puerto Rico
- Spouse: Fausta Bengoa
- Relations: Benicio del Toro (great-grandson)
- Profession: Handyman

Rafael Rivera Esbrí (2 July 1870 – 9 November 1965) was Mayor of Ponce, Puerto Rico from 1915 to 1917.

== Early years ==
Rivera Esbri was the son of Ramón Rivera Alvarado and Julia Esbri. He married Faneta Bengoa y Larrauri and had a daughter named Lili Belen, born around 1904. His great-grandson is actor Benicio del Toro.

== El Polvorín ==
Rivera Esbri is best remembered for an incident that has little to do with his work as mayor. He is remembered as the only civilian who in the company of seven of Ponce's firefighters confronted and brought under control the fire of 25 January 1899 that took place at the American munitions depot in the city of Ponce, located where the Ponce High School is currently located. Rivera Esbri and the others did this in defiance of an order from the American military officials not to attempt to fight the fire. Their bravery is said to have saved the city from total destruction.

=== Obelisk ===
In 1906, the Legislature of Puerto Rico issued a proclamation to declare Rafael Rivera Esbri and the seven firefighters heroes officially. In time, the city of Ponce also built an obelisk to their memory which is located at Plaza Las Delicias (See Monumento a los heroes de El Polvorín), and is dedicated to Rivera Esbri and the seven firefighters who risked their lives in the 25 January 1899 fire. Rivera Esbri's name, along with those of the firefighters are engraved on the obelisk.

== Mayoral work ==
As mayor, Rivera Esbri founded, in 1916, the cemetery at Barrio Coto Laurel in Ponce. Rivera Esbri founded Partido Ponceño, which was short-lived, and around 1950 he ran for mayor of Ponce.

== Death and burial ==
Upon his death, Rafael Rivera Esbri was buried at the mausoleum reserved for Ponce firefighters in the Monumento a los heroes de El Polvorín at Cementerio Civil de Ponce. He is the only civilian non-firefighter in the mausoleum. He died on 9 November 1965 at age 95.

== Honors ==
In Ponce there is a street in Urbanización Las Delicias of Barrio Magueyes named after him.

== See also ==
- Ponce, Puerto Rico
- List of Puerto Ricans
- List of mayors of Ponce, Puerto Rico
- 25 de Enero Street

Political offices
Preceded by Simón Moret Gallart	Mayor of Ponce, Puerto Rico; 1915–1917	Succeeded by Luis Yordán Dávila
