= Luis Muñoz Rivera (Ponce statue) =

Statue in Ponce, Puerto Rico

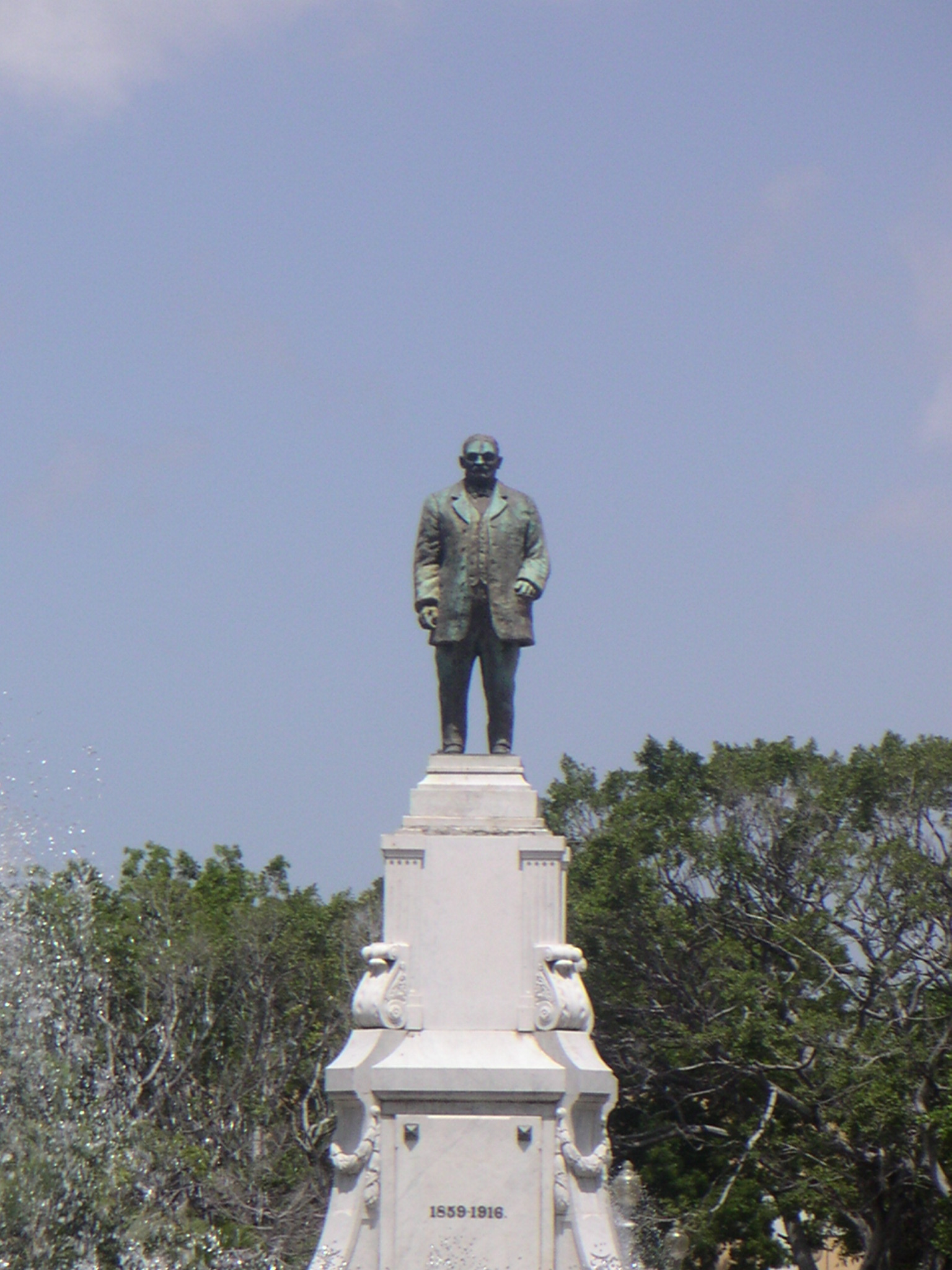

- Location of the statue within Puerto Rico
- Artist: Luigi Tomassi (Pietrasanta, Italy)
- Year: 1923
- Type: Bronze on marble pedestal
- Movement: Beaux Arts (pedestal)
- Condition: Pristine
- Location: Plaza Luis Muñoz Rivera Ponce; 18°00′43.848″N 66°36′50.6154″W
- Owner: Municipality of Ponce, PR

Luis Muñoz Rivera is a statue to the memory of Puerto Rican poet, journalist and politician Luis Muñoz Rivera located at Plaza Luis Muñoz Rivera in Ponce, Puerto Rico. The statue is in bronze. The statue's large marble pedestal follows in the Beaux Arts architectural tradition.

== Background ==
Luis Muñoz Rivera (17 July 1859 – 15 November 1916) was a Puerto Rican poet, journalist and politician. He was a major figure in the struggle for political autonomy of Puerto Rico. In 1887, Muñoz Rivera became part of the leadership of a newly formed Autonomist Party and became delegate for the district of Caguas. Subsequently, Muñoz Rivera was a member of a group organized by the party to discuss proposals of autonomy with Práxedes Mateo Sagasta, who would grant Puerto Rico an autonomous government following his election. He served as Chief of the Cabinet of Mateo Sagasta's government. On 13 August 1898, the Treaty of Paris transferred possession of Puerto Rico from Spain to the United States and a military government was established. In 1899, Muñoz Rivera resigned his position within Mateo Sagasta's cabinet. Muñoz Rivera then became a fierce advocate of the Liberal Party of Puerto Rico and, on 1 July 1890, he founded the party's newspaper, La Democracía, in Ponce, Puerto Rico. In 1893, Muñoz Rivera married Amalia Marín in a ceremony that took place in Ponce Cathedral. Muñoz Rivera participated in the writing of the Plan de Ponce which proposed administrative autonomy for the island. In 1909, he was elected as Resident Commissioner of Puerto Rico to U.S. Congress and participated in the creation of the Jones-Shafroth Act. Shortly after, Muñoz Rivera contracted an infection and traveled to Puerto Rico, where he died on 15 November 1916. His son, Luis Muñoz Marín, became the first democratically elected Governor of Puerto Rico.

== Description ==
The statue is the product of the foundry of Italian sculptor Luiggi Tomassi in Pietrasanta, Italy. It is made in bronze and was unveiled in 1923. It was installed on 28 November 1923. The statue's colossal pedestal is marble. Luis Yordán Dávila, mayor of Ponce at the time, was one of the main proponents of the monument.
