= Monumento a los héroes de El Polvorín (mausoleum) =

Mausoleum monument in Ponce, Puerto Rico

Monumento a los heroes de El Polvorín
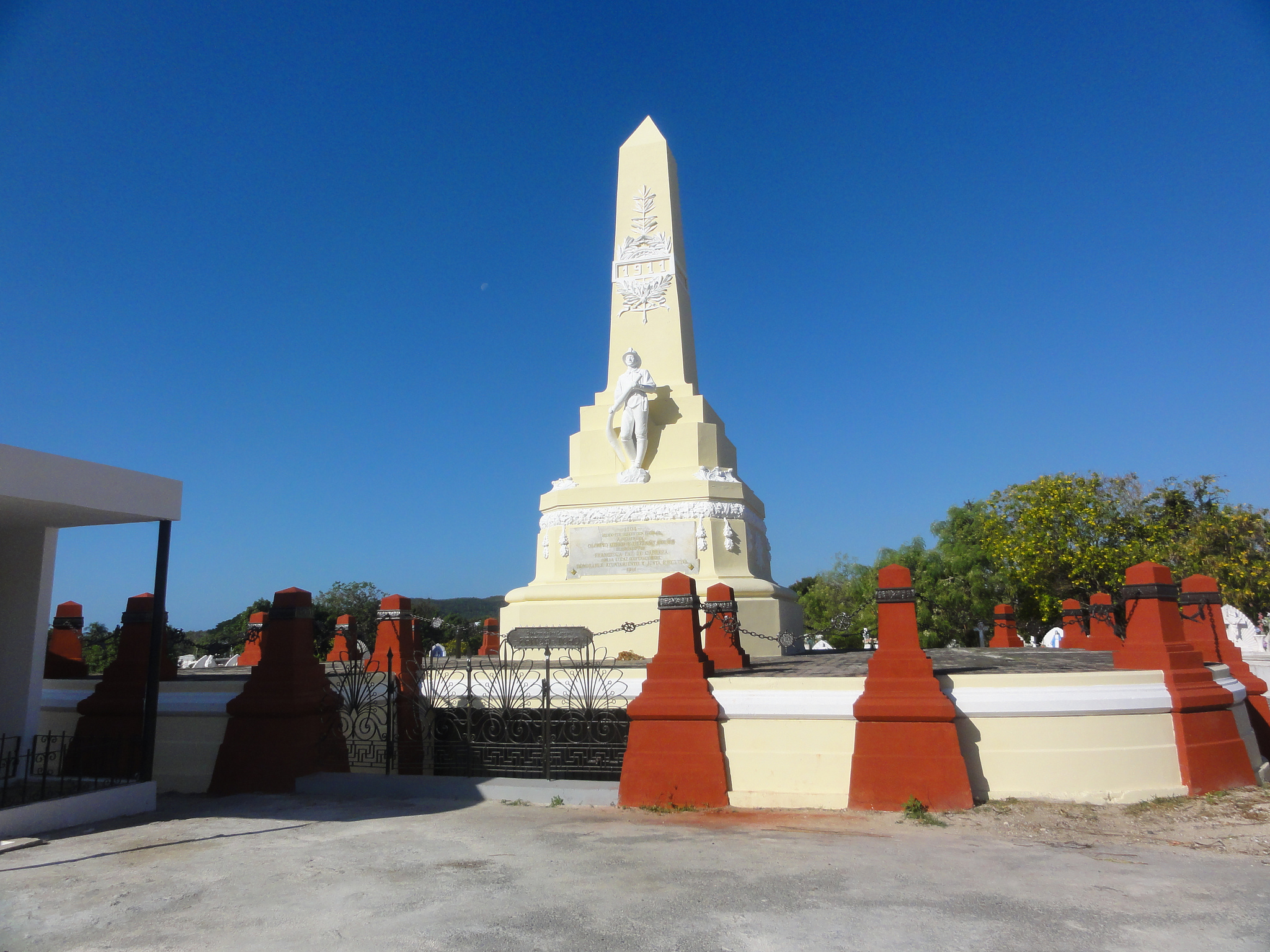
- Image of the mausoleum
- Interactive map of Monumento a los heroes de El Polvorín
- Location: Cementerio Civil, Barrio Portugués Urbano, Ponce, Puerto Rico
- Coordinates: 18°00′47.7714″N 66°37′58.2954″W
- Designer: Alfredo Wiechers Pieretti
- Type: Tomb, obelisk, and statue
- Material: Stucco and Concrete
- Length: approx 40 feet
- Width: approx 40 feet
- Height: approx. 50 feet
- Beginning date: ca. 1904 (source: the monument's front plaque)
- Completion date: 1911
- Opening date: 1911
- Dedicated to: The "El Polvorín" fire heroes
- Note: This monument is not the same as the obelisk at Plaza Las Delicias. Both are dedicated to the same group of men.

The Monumento a los heroes de El Polvorín (Monument to the "El Polvorín" fire heroes) is a mausoleum monument in Ponce, Puerto Rico, dedicated to the seven firefighters and one civilian who subdued the flames of the "El Polvorín" fire that took place on the night of 25 January 1899 in that city.

== Location ==
The monument is located in the Cementerio Civil de Ponce (Ponce Civil Cemetery), in barrio Portugués Urbano, Ponce, Puerto Rico. Its coordinates are N 18.01327 W 66.63286 (18° 0' 47.7714" N, 66° 37' 58.2954" W).

== Background ==
On 25 January 1899, a large fire (later dubbed "El Polvorín") threatened the lives of Ponceños, as well as the economy of Puerto Rico as a whole, given Ponce's de facto role as Puerto Rico's banking and agricultural capital. A painting inside Parque de Bombas commemorates the heroic acts of seven valiant "bomberos" and one civilian who fought bravely against the voracious fire that threatened the region. Disobeying orders from the American troops that had recently taken control of Puerto Rico, the group was able to appease the flames that had started inside the U.S. Army’s gunpowder reserves. Due to their courageous efforts, disaster was narrowly averted. For their heroic valor and success, the group was honored many times both in Ponce and the rest of Puerto Rico. The mausoleum was built to keep their remains in the after life and honor their memory. Buried in the tomb are the seven firefighters and one civilian who fought the fire. Also buried are 60 other Ponce firemen that have since qualified to be buried there.

== The structure ==
The mausoleum was built in 1911. This monument is different from the obelisk unveiled in 1948 and erected at Plaza Las Delicias, which is also dedicated to the same group of men. The obelisk and statue portions of this mausoleum were rebuilt in 2011, at the 100th anniversary of the original obelisk, statue and mausoleum (1911), and uncovered in time for its 101st anniversary, on 25 January 2012. The monument had been rebuilt in the 1950s and was rebuilt again in 2011-2012. The 2011-2012 restoration was performed by plastic arts artist Ramón Rivera Cáliz, director of the Secretaría de Arte y Cultura (Office of Arts and Culture) of the Municipality of Ponce. For this and many other contributions in the city of Ponce, on 12 December 2013, Rivera Cáliz was honored with a ceremony and added to the list of illustrious Ponce citizens at the Park of the Illustrious Ponce Citizens in Ponce's Tricentennial Park.

The monument is flanked by a 4-foot high foundation and surrounded by 19 3-foot high columns connected by chain segments. The chain segments are adorned with metal stamps depicting Ponce firefighting equipment and the stamps have dates on them. These surrounding columns and chain segments have a total length of some 40 feet on each side and form a square that measures 40-feet x 40-feet. There is also an interior chain located closer to the obelisk itself, this one supported by four 3-foot high columns. There is a marble plaque at the base of the obelisk with an inscription that reads (Note: English translation is not part of the inscription, and it is given here to the right):

| 1904 -; Erijido por suscripción popular a iniciativa de Olimpio Otero y Ulpiano Colom secundado por Francisca Paz de Cabrera con la Eficaz Cooperación del Honorable Ayuntamiento y Junta Ejecutiva: 1911 - | 1904 -; Erected by popular support under the initiative of Olimpio Otero and Ulpiano Colom seconded by Francisca Paz de Cabrera with the efficient cooperation of the honorable Mayor and its Cabinet.: 1911 - |

The segments of the exterior chain have metal insignias with dates on them. Many of the dates are repeated. The dates mark significant events in the history of the Ponce Fire Corps. The dates include, 2 February 1883, date on which the Ponce Fire Corps moved to what is today Parque de Bombas Museum. Another date is 30 May 1906, date on which the first group of land lots were awarded to Ponce firefighters for the construction of their own homes on Calle 25 de Enero street. A third date is, of course, 25 January 1899, the date of the El Polvorín fire.

The mausoleum proper is located under the obelisk, at below ground level. The entrance to the mausoleum contains another inscription, in a two-column format, which reads:

Spanish Original:

| Junta Ejecutiva : | Jefe del Cuerpo: |
| Simon Moret | Julio Rosich |
| Gillermo Vivas | Arquitecto: |
| Luis Porrata D. | A. Wiechers |
| Julio Rosich | Ingeniero Director: |
| Blas C. Silva | Blas C. Silva |
| Olimpio Otero | C[onstrucción]: E. Concepcion |

English Translation:

| Executive Board : | Fire Chief: |
| Simon Moret | Julio Rosich |
| Gillermo Vivas | Architect: |
| Luis Porrata D. | A. Wiechers |
| Julio Rosich | Lead Engineer: |
| Blas Silva | Blas Silva |
| Olimpio Otero | Construction: E. Concepcion |

== Homage to firefighters ==
Another plaque, this one in the shape of a stonehead, protects the final entryway into the tombs of the mausoleum. It reads as follows:

| "Hay algo en este grave monumento que eleva nuestros ojos a la altura. !En las entrañas la piedra dura el valor y el deber tienen su asiento! Tras la breve jornada de un momento, aqui yacen en noble sepultura los heroes de una vida de amargura que a las llamas quitaron su ardimiento. Amargo es el vivir de los mortales que lucharon por curar ajenos males, al mandato divino siempre fieles. Por eso estos funebres umbrales reza el mundo sus preces fraternales y entreteje la Gloria sus laureles". | "There is something in this grave monument that raises our eyes to the heights. In the depths of the hard stone, valour and duty have their throne! After a brief one day's work, here lay in noble rest the heroes of a bitter life who took away the fire from the flames. It's bitter the life of the mortals who fought to cure others' burdens: to the divine command always faithful. This is why these sober passways the world prays its fraternal prayers and the Heavens weaves its laurels." |

== The honored ==
All Ponce firefighters with five or more years of service are eligible to be buried in this mausoleum, and 60 rest in it so far, in addition to the initial eight. The structure particularly honors the following seven firefighters and one civilian from the 25 January 1899 El Polvorín fire:

- Rafael Rivera Esbri (civilian and later mayor of Ponce)
- Pedro Sabater
- Rafael del Valle
- Cayetano Casals
- Pedro Ruiz
- Juan Romero
- Gregorio Rivera
- Tomas Rivera
