= Plaza Degetau =

Large plaza at square in Ponce, Puerto Rico

- { Part of Plaza Las Delicias } Formerly, Plaza Real (1818) and Plaza Mayor (1874)
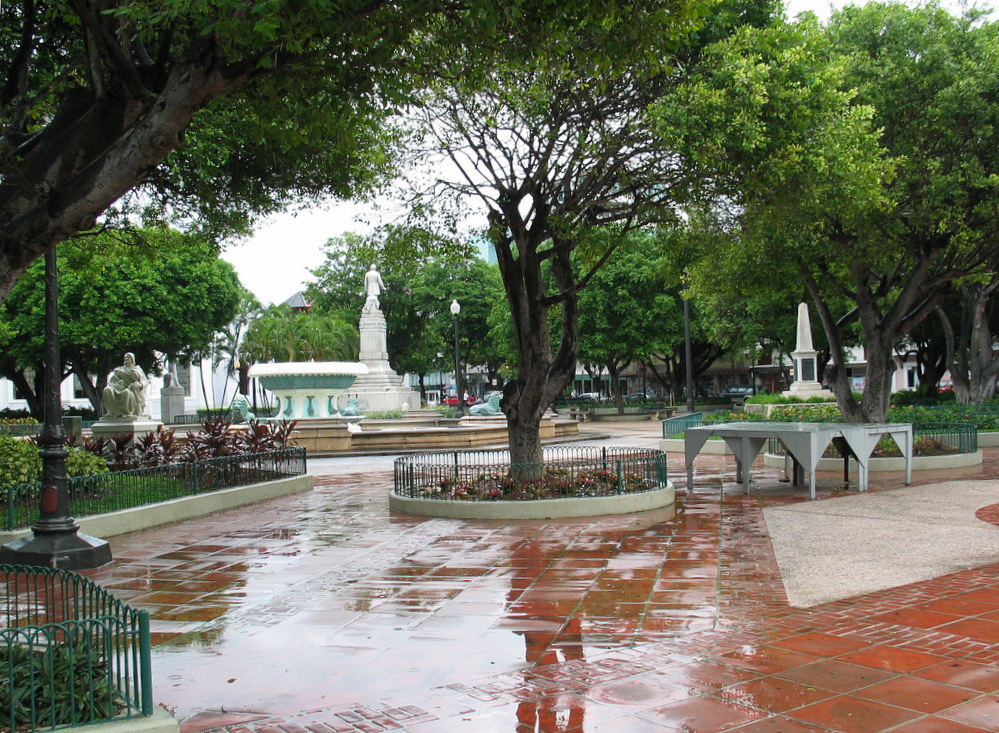
- Plaza Degetau, one of two main plazas at Plaza Las Delicias

- Location within Puerto Rico
- Type: Plaza, urban park
- Location: Ponce, Puerto Rico
- Coordinates: 18°00′40.75″N 66°36′50.15″W
- Area: 6,400 square metres (69,000 ft^{2})
- Created: 1670
- Operator: Autonomous Municipality of Ponce
- Visitors: Over 200,000
- Status: Opened all year, 24 hours/day

Plaza Degetau, formally Plaza Federico Degetau, is the larger of two plazas at Plaza Las Delicias, the main city square in the city of Ponce, Puerto Rico. The other plaza is named Plaza Muñoz Rivera and is located north of Plaza Degetau. The square is notable for its fountains and for the various monuments it contains. The historic Parque de Bombas and Ponce Cathedral buildings are located bordering the north side of this plaza. The square is the center of the Ponce Historic Zone, and it is flanked by the historic Ponce City Hall to the south, the cathedral and historic firehouse to the north, the NRHP-listed Banco Crédito y Ahorro Ponceño and Banco de Ponce buildings to the east, and the Armstrong-Poventud Residence to the west. The square dates back to the early Spanish settlement in Ponce of 1670. It is the main tourist attraction of the city, receiving about a quarter of a million visitors per year.

== History ==
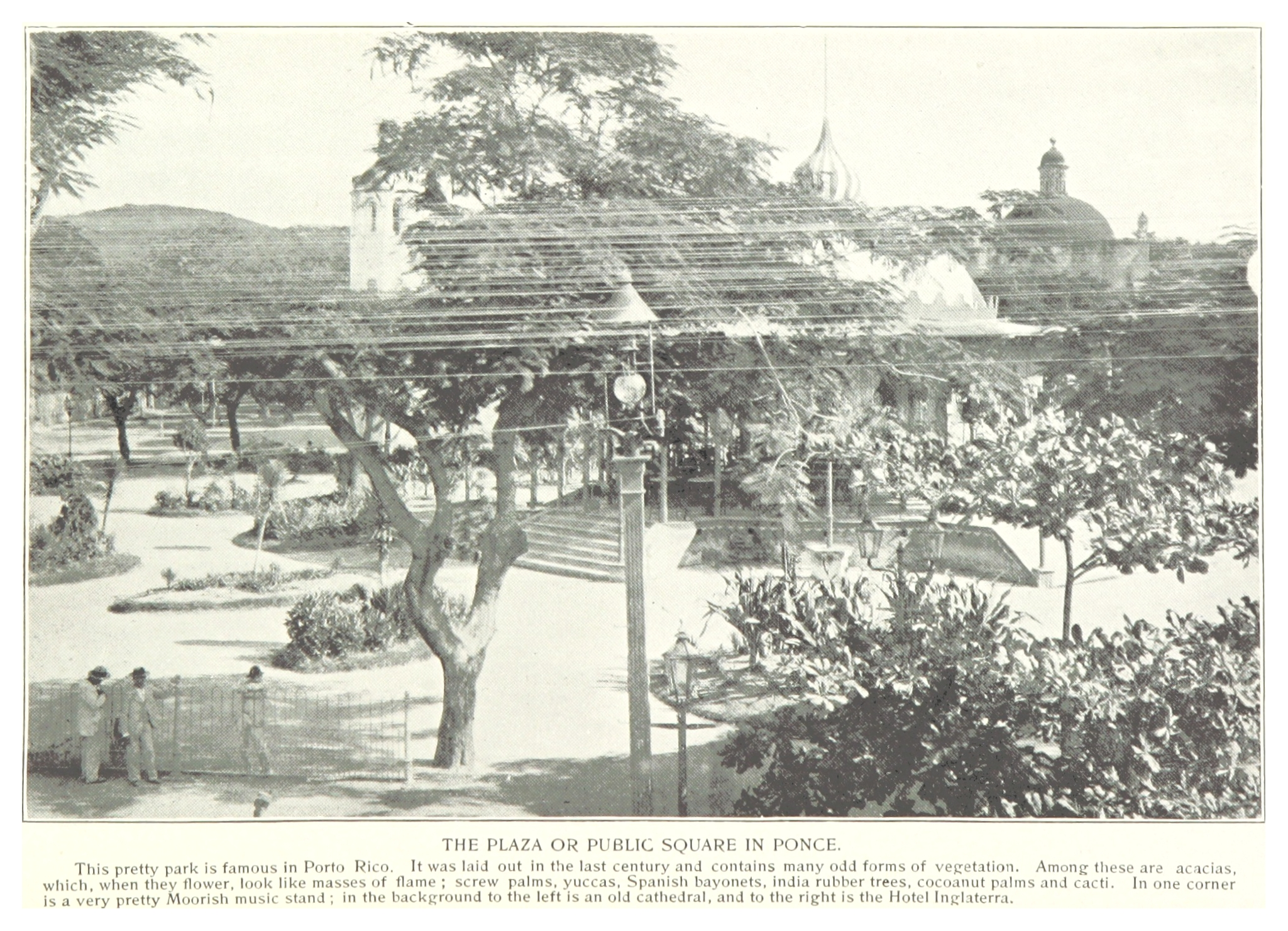
Plaza Degetau circa 1890s, when it was still called Plaza Mayor, looking north-northwest

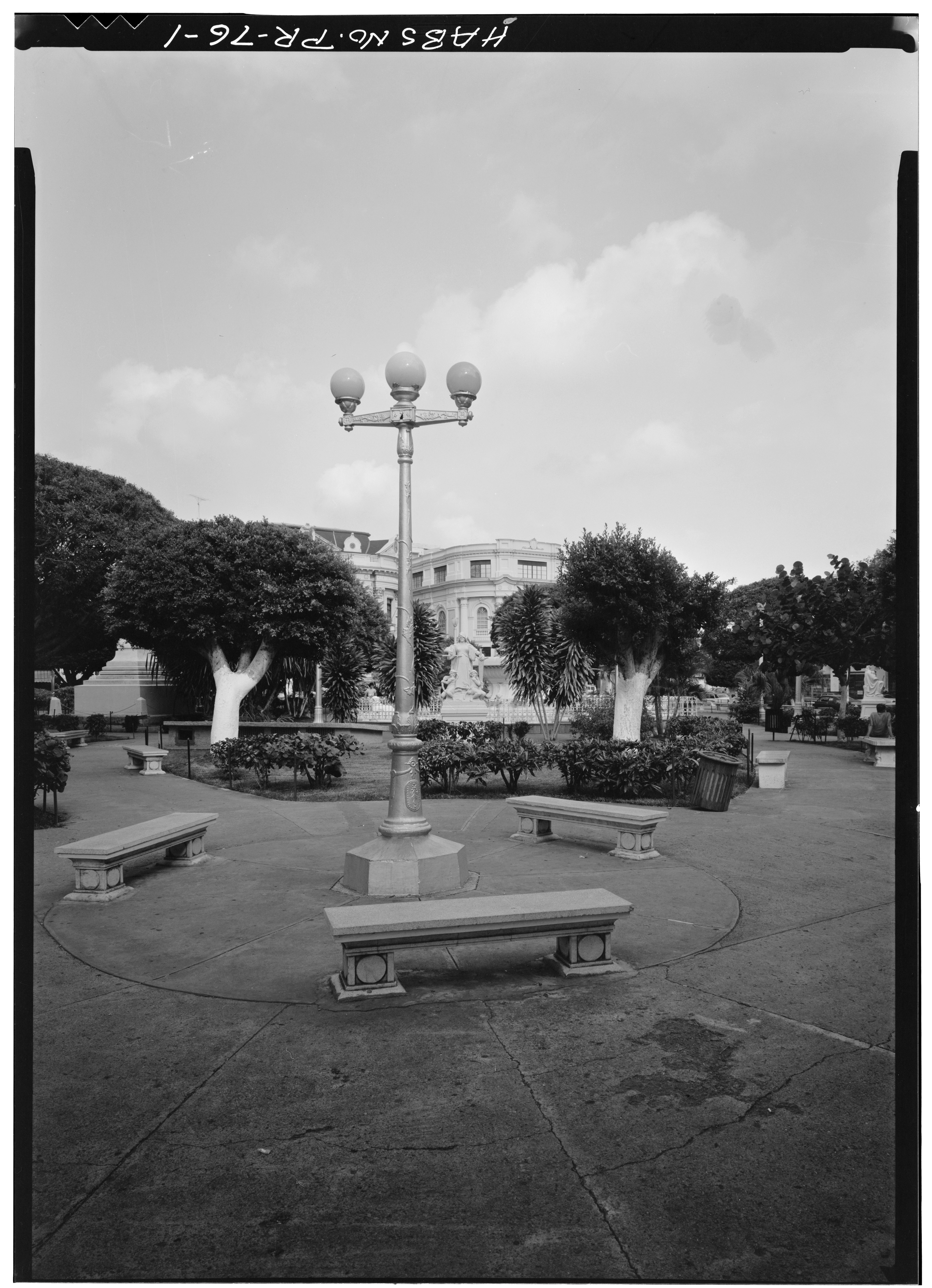
Plaza Degetau, ca. 1950, looking east-southeast

According to the traditional Spanish colonial custom, a town's main square, or plaza, was the center of the town. In the case of Ponce, a Catholic church was built on the center of the plaza, thus splitting the plaza into two sections. Plaza Degetau (the subject of this article) is the southern of the two sections (see "Diagram of Plaza Las Delicias" herein), with the other plaza, Plaza Muñoz Rivera, located to the north of Plaza Federico Degetau. Plaza Degetau measures 6,400 square meters.

The history of Plaza Degetau dates back to as far as the creation of the first Catholic chapel in Ponce in 1670. It is also known that around 1840 Mayor Salvador de Vives planted trees as a renovation project for plaza. It was first lit in 1864. The plaza, as it stands today, was designed by architect Francisco Porrata-Doria in 1914.

In addition to the cathedral and the firehouse, Plaza Degetau at one point also contained an open dining Moorish-style kiosk that had been part of the 1882 Fair Exposition. The kiosk was still present at the time of the American invasion of the island in 1898 as reported by American photo-journalist William Dinwiddie, but it was demolished in 1914.

== Name ==
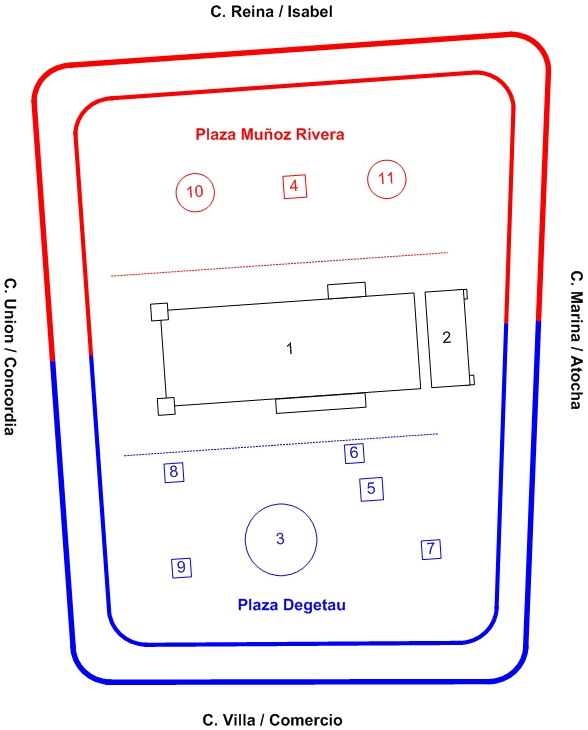
Diagram of Plaza Las Delicias. The upper (north/red) section is the Plaza Luis Muñoz Rivera while the lower (south/blue) section is the Plaza Federico Degetau. Legend: 1. Cathedral Nuestra Señora de la Guadalupe; 2. Parque de Bombas; 3. Lions Fountain; 4. Statue of Luis Muñoz Rivera; 5. Statue of Juan Morel Campos; 6. Statue of Domingo Cruz "Cocolia"; 7. Obelisk to "El Polvorin" Firemen; 8. Statue of Blind Justice; 9. Statue of woman with children, "Maternity"; 10 & 11. Large Fountains

Plaza Degetau was originally called Antigua Plaza Real (Old Royal Plaza), and later, Plaza Mayor (Main Plaza). In the early 20th century its name was officially changed to Plaza Federico Degetau, in honor of Federico Degetau, the first Resident Commissioner of Puerto Rico to the United States House of Representatives.

== Features ==
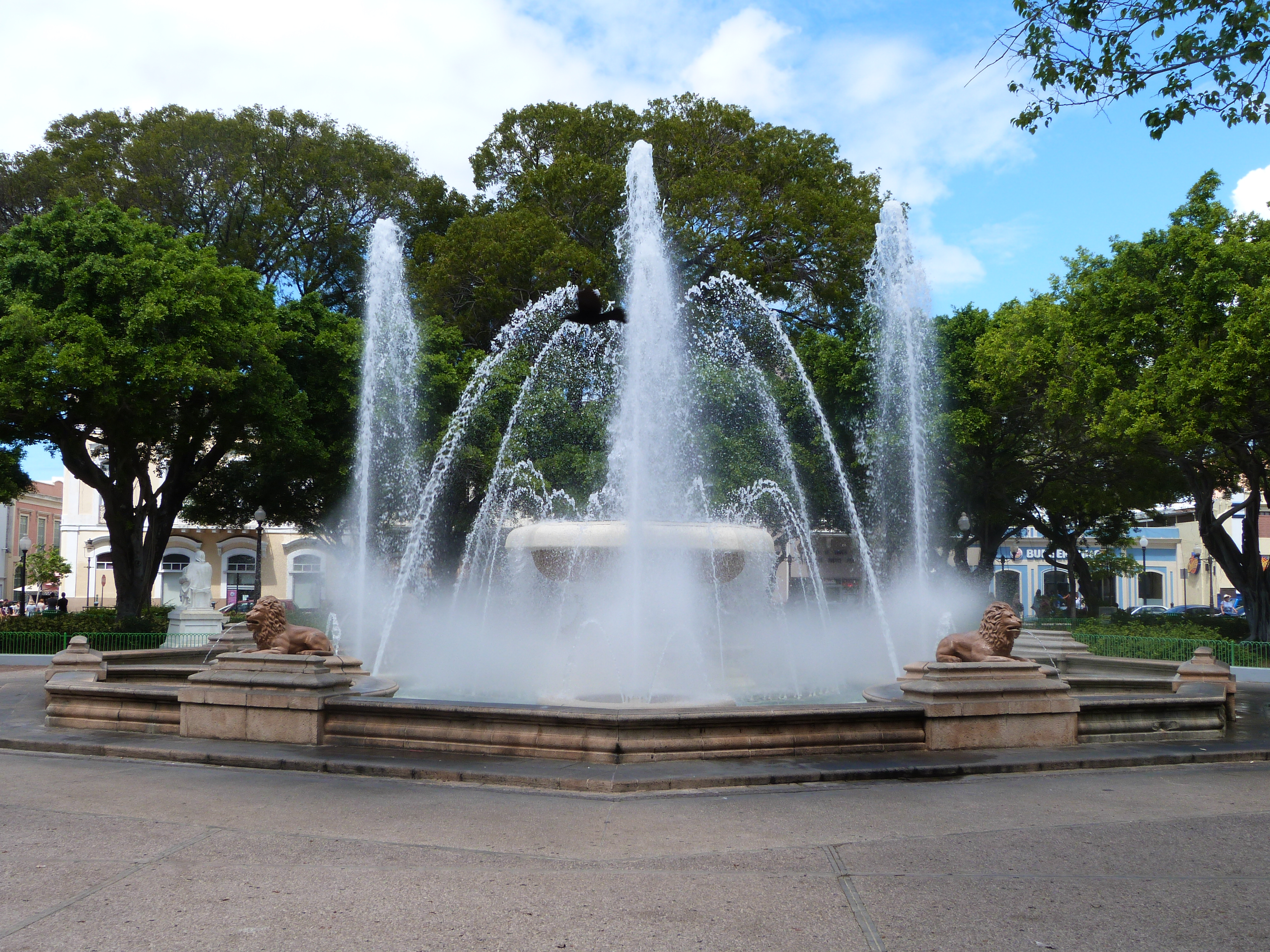
The Lions Fountain on Plaza Degetau

Plaza Degetau is perhaps the best known of the two plazas and the one most often seen in pictures.

=== Fuente de los Leones ===
In the center of this plaza lies the famous Fuente de los Leones (Lions Fountain). The large, round-shaped fountain is bounded by a low, marble and granite wall. The fountain's wall boundary is shaped in the form of a regular octagon and built so that one of the vertices of the octagon points towards the historic Ponce City Hall. The fountain also features four lion statues and water that flows under colored lighting effects. The four lion statues are located one statue on each alternating vertex of the fountain's octagonal boundary wall.

In 1878 the spot now occupied by Fuente de los Leones was occupied by a monument to the Spanish Constitution of 1812. It had been erected under the direction of 1812 mayor of Ponce Jose Ortiz de la Renta, ca. 1820, but was removed in the 1870s by Carlist mayor and Spanish military officer Elicio Berriz. (Note: Historian Eduardo Neumann Gandía spells his name "Eliseo Berriz". See "Verdadera y Autentica Historia de la Ciudad de Ponce". 1913. (Reprinted by the Instituto de Cultura Puertorriqueña, 1987. p.99.)) In 1882, the location was then occupied by "Arab kiosk" (a.k.a., "Kiosko La Alhambra") built in 1882 for the 1882 Ponce Fair. The kiosk was demolished in 1914. The current (2022) fountain was purchased in 1939 at the New York World's Fair. (Note: Jose Enrique Oyoroa Santaliz states the fountain was inaugurated in 1902 (See Jose Enrique Ayoroa Santaliz. Un hito en su tiempo: la fuente de agua subterránea de la Plaza Las Delicias. La Perla del Sur. Ponce, Puerto Rico. Year 39. Issue 1993. 9–15 February 2022. pp.8-9. Archived.) but this appears anachronistic for Socorro Girón states the kiosk was not demolished until 1914 (See Socorro Girón. Ponce, el teatro La Perla y La Campana de la Almudaina. Gobierno Municipal de Ponce. 1992. p. 202.). Furthermore, Harry S. Pariser states that Fuente de los Leones was purchased in 1939 (See Harry S. Pariser. Explore Puerto Rico. p.243. here), so it could not have been inaugurated in 1902, almost 40 years earlier. One explanation could be that after the Arab Kiosk was demolished in 1914 (and until 1939) there was a, perhaps, smaller and simpler fountain at this location which the fountain from the 1939 NYC World's Fair (the current one) then replaced. However, this would still not explain Oyoroa Santaliz's claim that "in 1902, the "Fuente de los Leones", which we still enjoy today, was inaugurated", because it would be contradictory to Socorro Girón's statement that the kiosk at that location was demolished in 1914, twelve years after Oyoroa Santaliz's alleged inauguration of the fountain there. Another explanation yet could be that the Arab kiosk, though located at the same plaza as the current Fuente de Los Leones, may have, in fact, been located further east of the current location of Fuente de Los Leones, permitting Fuente de Los Leones to co-exist next to the Arab kiosk from 1902 to 1914, when the kiosk was demolished.) When originally installed, it was adorned with baby angel sculptures, but in the early 1940s the baby angels were replaced with the current (2022) lions. The lions were sculptured in 1940 by Victor Cott, a sculptor from Juana Diaz, during the mayoral administration of mayor Andrés Grillasca Salas. The fountain, including a mechanical basement, was remodeled and restored in 1993. Its base was enlarged and a computerized lighting system was installed.

The fountain was the inspiration for a poem published in 2002, that reads,

Spanish Este fuenta fantastica es un sueño, Que una noche romantica de orgia Tejieron el amor y la poesia, Con las ansias divinas del ensueño. En multiples colores el diseño Hace verter el agua en pedreria. Y es como una sutil policromia, Aquel paisaje esplendido y risueño. El agua brota en chorros incesantes, Mientras arriba el cielo resplandece, Alfombrado de estrellas rutilantes. Y es ya tanta su fuerza sugestiva, Que el alma al contemplarla se estremece Con un arrobamiento que cautiva. Jose Ortiz Lecodet	English This fantastic fountain is a dream, That a wildly romantic night Knitted love and poetry, With the divine cravings of daydream. In multiplicity of colors the design, Makes water be poured into rhinestones. And it is like a subtle polychromy, That splendid and smiling landscape. The water spouts in endless jets, While the sky above glows, Covered with sparkling stars. And its suggestive force is so strong, That the soul shakes when contemplating it With a trance that captivates. Jose Ortiz Lecodet

=== Juan Morel Campos ===
This plaza also features a statue of native composer Juan Morel Campos. This statue was produced at the workshop of Italian sculptor Luiggi Tomassi.

=== Other features ===
Also in this plaza is an obelisk in honor of the firefighters who fought the "El Polvorín" fire (see Parque de Bombas). The obelisk was unveiled in 1948, in time for the 50th anniversary of the frightful fire.

In the northwest side of the plaza and facing northwest, there is also a statue, called Blind Justice, of a woman in a long dress with her eyes covered by a cloth wrapped around the top of her head. The woman's left hand holds a sword that sits inside a shaft which rests on the ground, and there are two children sitting happily by her feet: one is embracing the lower part of the sword's shaft and the other child is playing with an orange tree branch. Blind Justice sits on the northwest area of the plaza and faces northwest.

A second statue, Maternity, sits on the plaza as well. This one consists of a woman sitting down and sitting two small children on her lap, one child sits on her left leg and the other one on her right leg, while the children lean against her chest. Maternity sits on the southwest side of the plaza and faces southwest. These two statues were designed by Victor Cott, a sculptor from Juana Diaz who also designed the four lions at Fuente de los Leones, Esclavo libertado and La Labradora.

La Labradora is a third statue that used to be located on Plaza Degetau, on the southeast section of the plaza, facing southeast, but today (2018) adorns Parque Graciela Rivera. La Labradora, together with a fourth sculpture yet called El Cuerno de la Abundancia (The Horn of Abundance), were moved out of the plaza in the late 1940s to make room for the Monumento a los heroes de El Polvorín (1948) and the statue of Juan Morel Campos (~1950), respectively. El Cuerno de la Abundancia was located on the northeast section of the plaza and faced northeast but, in the late 1940s, was relocated to elsewhere in the city of Ponce; unfortunately, it was vandalized at the new location and was lost. The placing of the statues as well as the relocation of the last two statues, occurred during the 16-year mayoral administration of Andrés Grillasca Salas in the 1940s-1950s.

== Setting ==
Plaza Degetau is bounded on the north by the Our Lady of Guadalupe Cathedral and the historic Parque de Bombas firehouse, on the south by Plaza Degetau street (also called Villa street and Comercio street), on the west by Union street, and on the east by Marina street. It is surrounded by two hotels, the Ponce City Hall, two historic banks (Banco de Ponce and Banco Crédito), a long-standing ice cream parlor called "King's Ice Cream", and various boutiques and cafes.

The plaza has wide mosaic-tile sidewalks, well-manicured flower gardens, well-trimmed bushes and Indian laurel trees, late 1800s lamposts, and numerous marble benches. It is home to the Lions Fountain, "one of the most beautiful fountains in Puerto Rico." The fountain is made of marble and bronze. During the day, the plaza hustles with schoolchildren, shoppers, and tourists. After the sun sets, there are oftentimes live bands giving concerts to "multigenerational families."

== Gallery ==
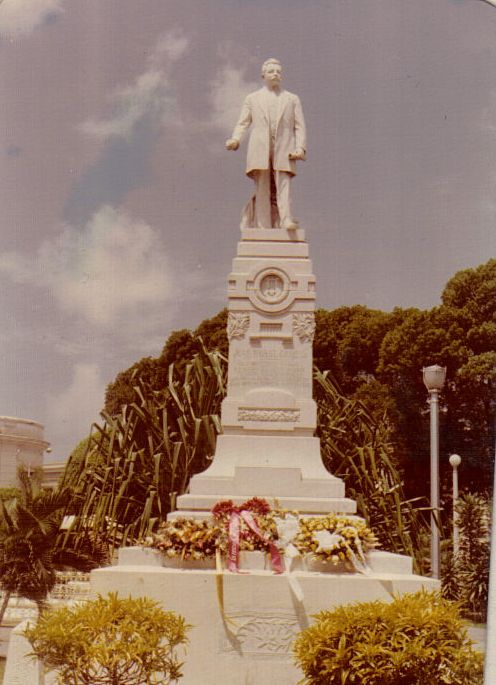
Statue of Juan Morel Campos at Plaza Degetau, in 1977

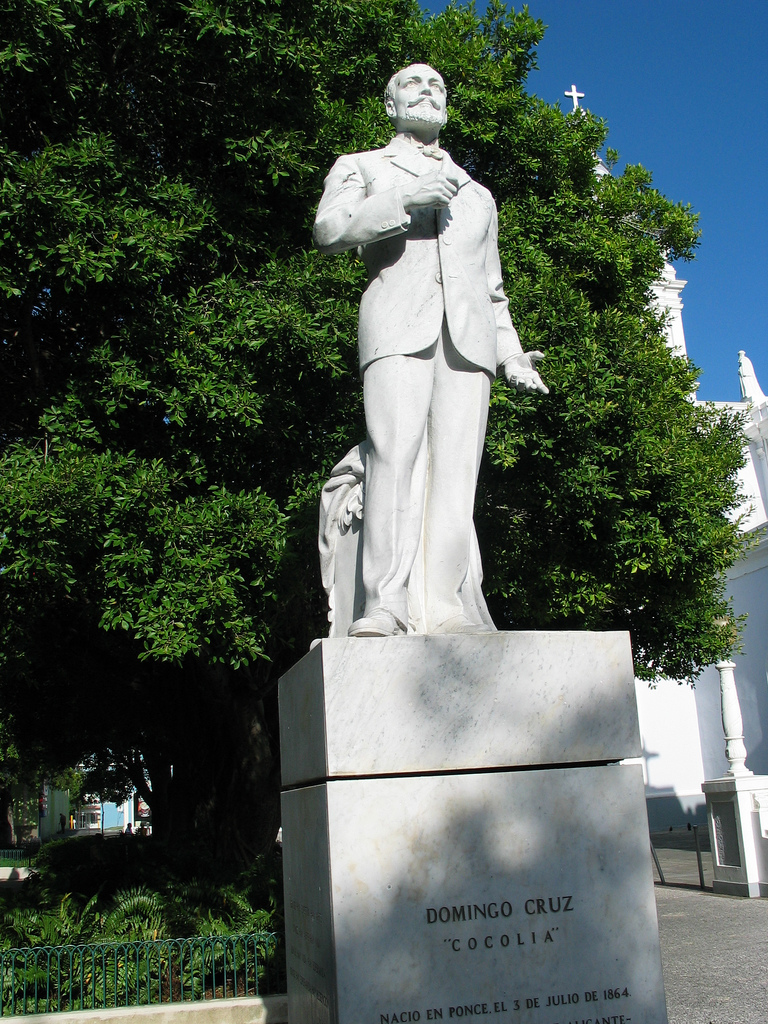
Statue of Domingo Cruz "Cocolia" at Plaza Degetau, in 2010

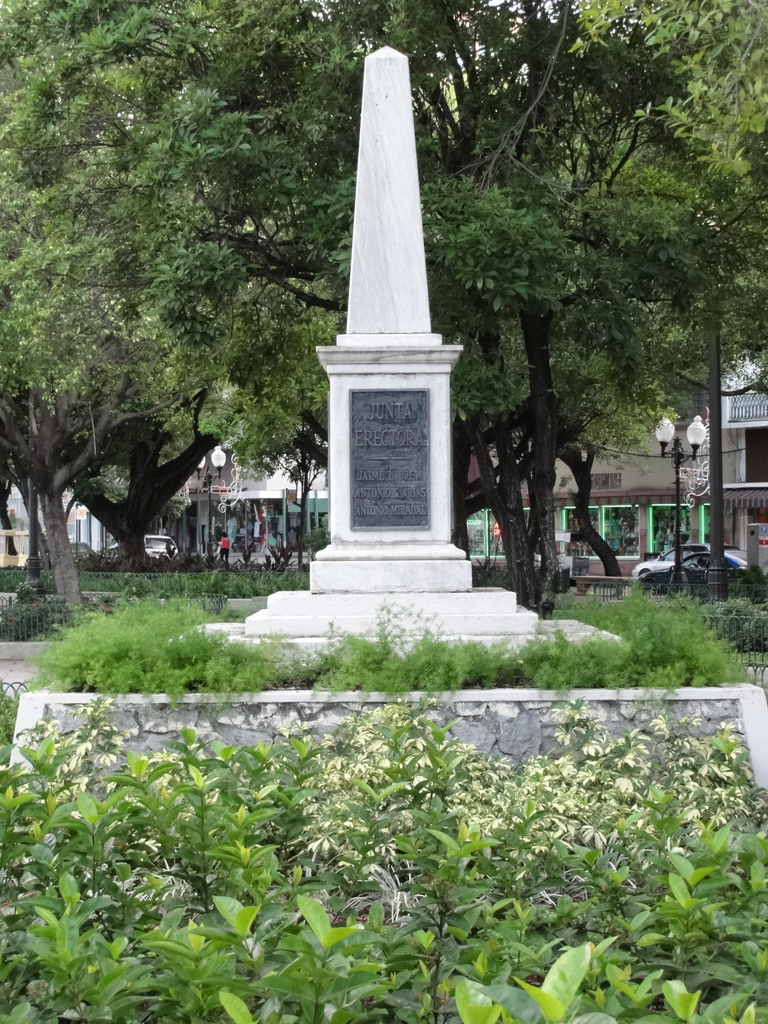
Obelisk to El Polvorin firefighters in Plaza Degetau, in 2010

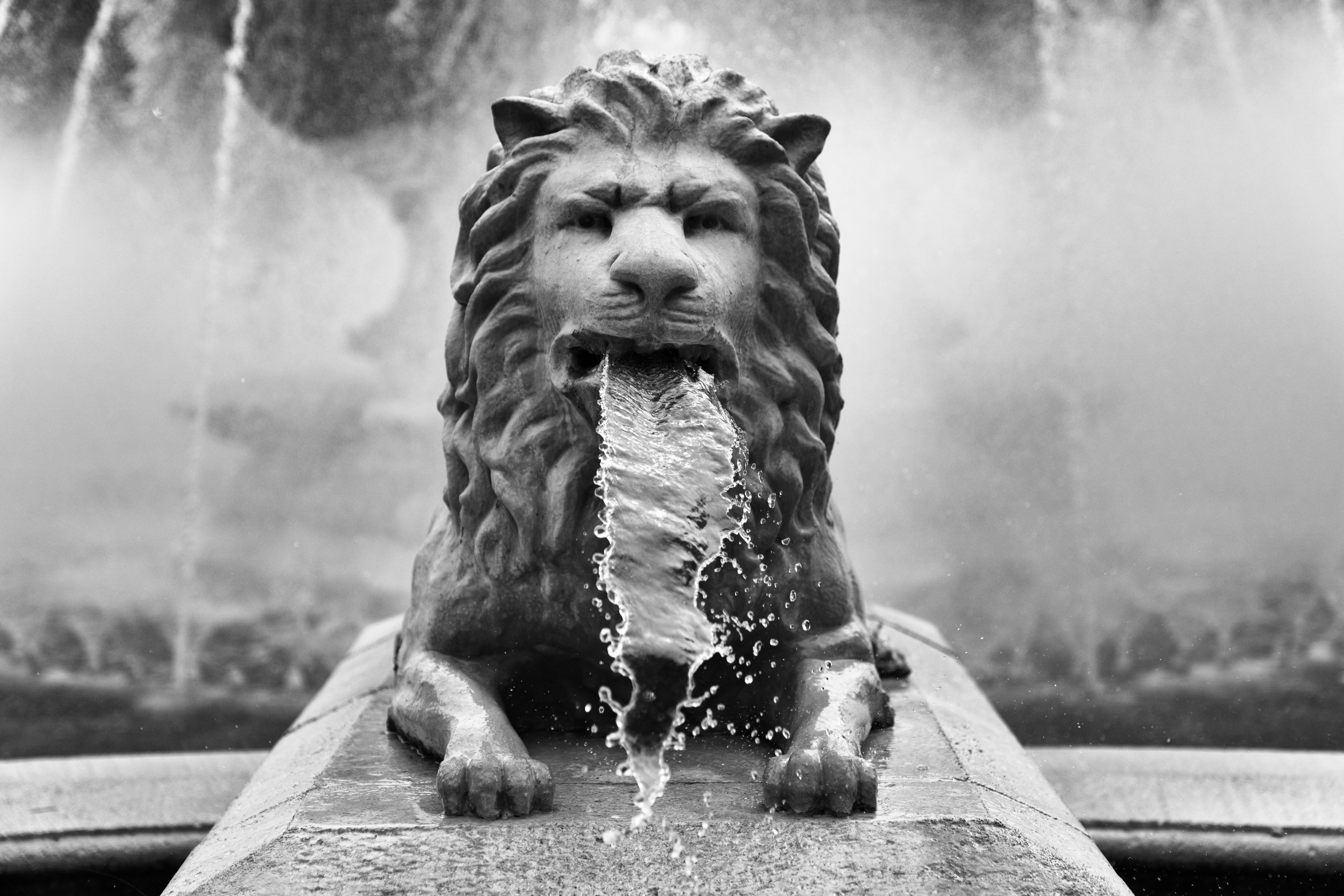
A lion fountain at Plaza Degetau
