= Cementerio Civil de Ponce =

Historic burial ground in Ponce, Puerto Rico

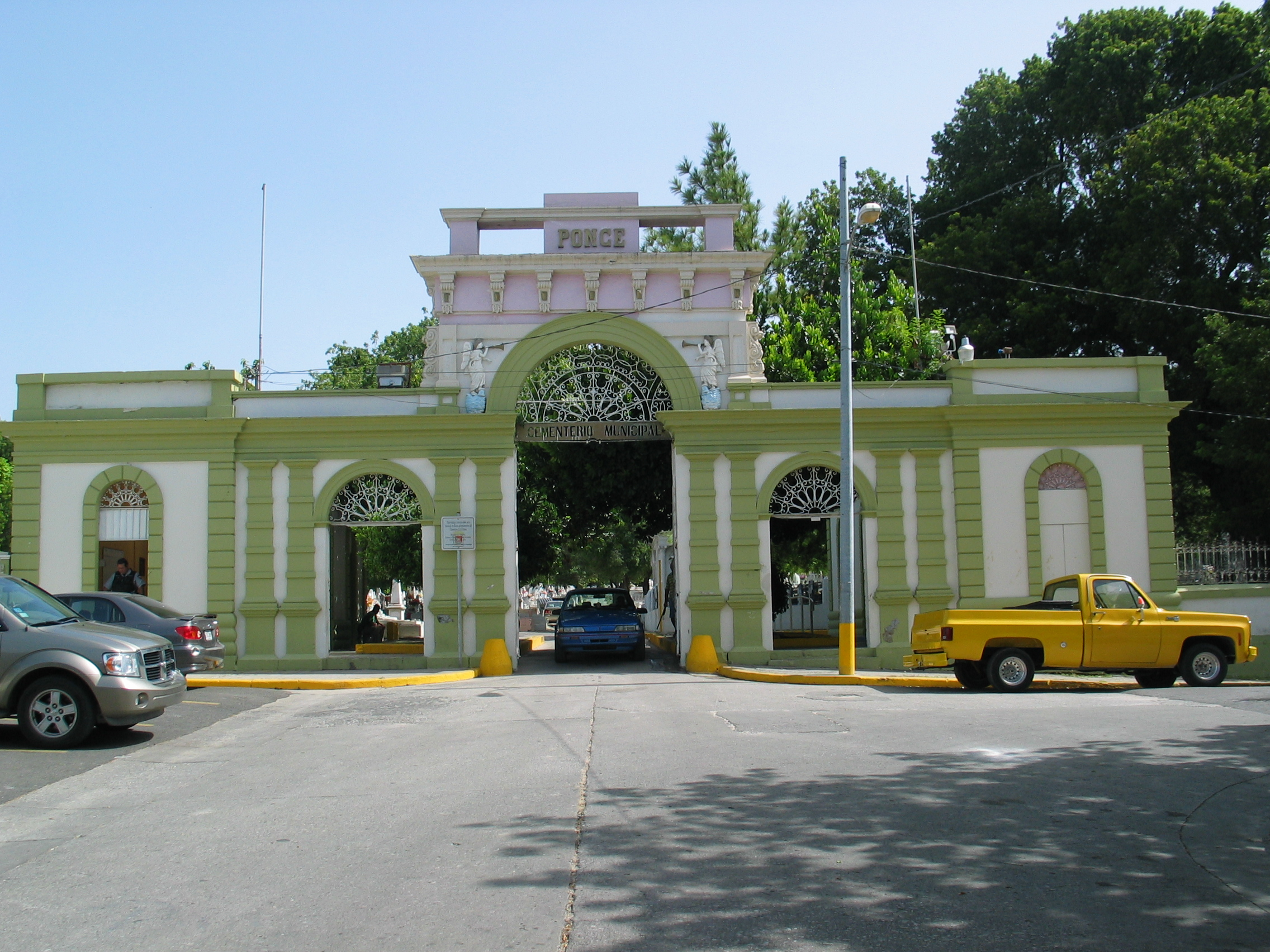
- View of the cemetery's entrance
- Interactive map of Cementerio Civil de Ponce

Details
- Established: 1901
- Location: Barrio Portugues Urbano, Ponce, Puerto Rico
- Country: Puerto Rico
- Coordinates: 18.01327°N 66.63286°W
- Type: Public; a.k.a., Cementerio Municipal
- Style: Art Deco
- Owned by: Municipality of Ponce
- Size: Unknown
- No. of graves: Est. 1,000
- Terms of lease: In perpetuity
- Find a Grave: Cementerio Civil de Ponce
- Footnotes: Manuel V. Domenech, Architect

Cementerio Civil de Ponce (Ponce Civil Cemetery), a.k.a., Cementerio Municipal de Ponce, is a historic burial ground in Ponce, Puerto Rico. It was founded in 1901. (Note: Socorro Giron states it was inaugurated in 1904 (Ponce, el teatro La Perla y La Campana de la Almudaina. 1992. p. 431.)) It was designed by Manuel V. Domenech. Some of the people buried at Cementerio Civil include Ruth Fernández, Isabel la Negra and Héctor Lavoe. It is believed to be the largest cemetery in Puerto Rico.

The cemetery is also home to the Monumento a los heroes de El Polvorín (Monument to the El Polvorin Heroes). It is located in Barrio Portugues Urbano at N 18.01327 W 66.63286 (18° 0' 47.7714" N, 66° 37' 58.2954" W).

== Notable interments ==
- Ruth Fernández, singer and politician
- Isabel la Negra, brothel owner, philanthropist
- Héctor Lavoe, salsa and bolero singer
- Rafael Rivera Esbrí, politician
- Herminia Tormes García, first female Puerto Rican judge of Puerto Rico.
- Orlando McFarlane, MLB player for the Pittsburgh Pirates
- Antonio Correa Cotto, outlaw

== See also ==
- Cementerio Católico San Vicente de Paul
- Museo del Autonomismo Puertorriqueño
- Panteón Nacional Román Baldorioty de Castro
