= Parque de Bombas =

Historic fire station in Ponce, Puerto Rico

- Parque de Bombas de Ponce
- U.S. National Register of Historic Places
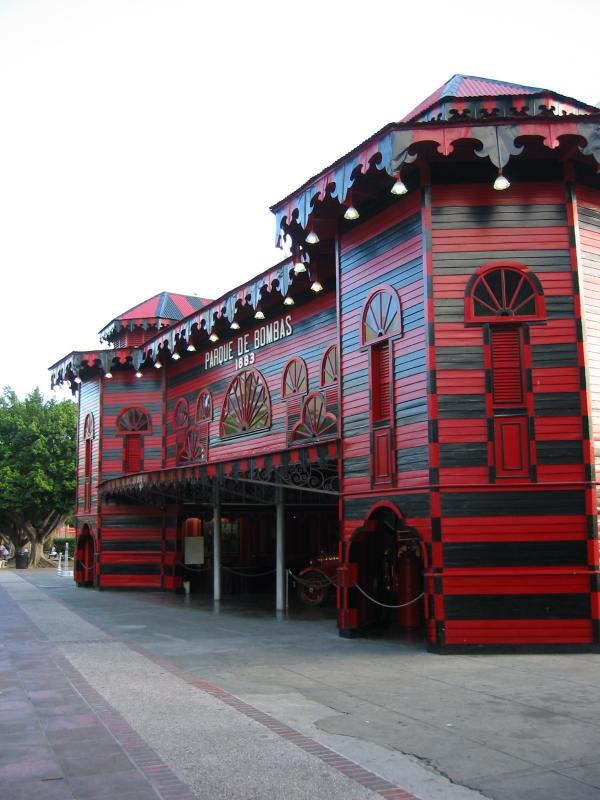
- Old Parque de Bombas firehouse building

- Location within Puerto Rico
- Location: Plaza Las Delicias; Ponce, Puerto Rico
- Coordinates: 18°00′43″N 66°36′49″W
- Area: less than one acre
- Built: 1882
- Architect: Maximo de Meana y Guridi
- Architectural style: Gothic Revival, Victorian, Moorish Revival
- NRHP reference No.: 84003150
- Added to NRHP: 12 July 1984

The Parque de Bombas (English: firehouse (Note: An archaic term for fire station, now known in Spanish as an estación de bomberos (See, Jason Rodriguez Grafal. "Confirmado: Falta de equipo retrasó respuesta a incendio en el Ponce Centro." La Perla el Sur. Year 35. Issue 1787. 28 February 2018. Page 4.).)) is a historic former fire station in Ponce, Puerto Rico. It is one of Puerto Rico's most notable buildings, with some considering it "by far the most easily recognized landmark in the Island."

The Parque de Bombas is located at the Plaza Las Delicias town square, directly behind Ponce Cathedral. Originally built in 1882 as a pavilion for an exhibition, it became Puerto Rico's first ever fire station. In 1990, the fire station closed and was converted into a museum. It was listed in the National Register of Historic Places on 12 July 1984.

== History ==
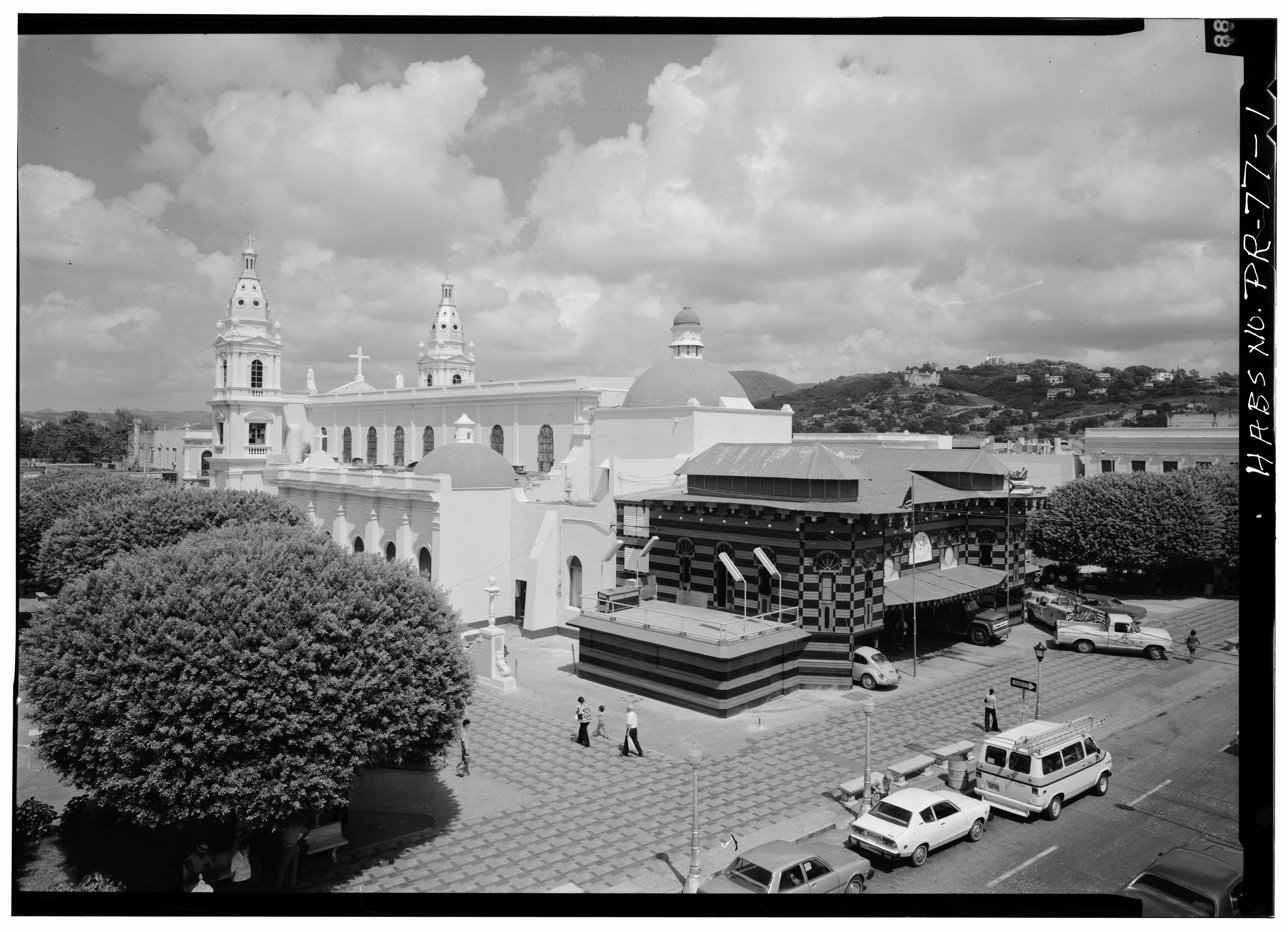
Parque de Bombas in August 1977

The structure was built as the main exhibit pavilion for the 1882 Exhibition Trade Fair. The Madrid-based central government assigned the task of designing and constructing it to a Spanish Army officer, Lt. Colonel Máximo de Meana y Guridi who was also a trained architect and later served as Mayor of the city.

The building was unveiled at the fair. After the fair concluded, the pavilion became a fire station. The first firefighters to work in the building were stationed on 2 February 1883. In 1885, its official name was changed to Estación de Bomberos de Ponce (Ponce Fire Station).

In 1920, the building was used briefly as the Mayor's office as a result of the 1918 San Fermín earthquake that affected the city during that year.

In 1967 and due to the distinctive appearance and central location of this firehouse, the Ponce municipal flag was designed using the red and black colors of its iconic firehouse as its base colors. The Fireman's Band, originally played weekly concerts from an open second floor stage attached to Parque de Bombas. Now known as the Ponce Municipal Band, the band continues to play every Sunday evening, though in different locations. On 12 May 1960, a new fire station was built nearby at the junction of Calle Mayor and Calle Cristina. This new structure became the main fire station for the city, reducing Parque de Bombas to a secondary role.

== Cultural significance ==
Since 1885, Parque de Bombas has been an important cultural institution in Ponce. Its colors represent the city,. The Banda Municipal de Ponce (formerly, the Fireman's Band), originally played weekly concerts from an open second floor stage attached to Parque de Bombas, and now continues to play every Sunday evening. Called "Retretas", they are part of a cultural program and tradition of the city of Ponce. The structure's format represents the brave firemen of Ponce, and its history. An inscription at Parque de Bombas reads, "This building is a symbol and commemoration of the importance vested by the residents of Ponce in the service, self-denial and courage of the Ponce Firefighters Corps. It is for this reason that the Ponce Firefighters Corps remains symbolically on this Plaza, in the heart of the city of Ponce." In 1943, the Firemen Services of Puerto Rico was created by legislation. Its main commitment is to extinguish fires, prevent fires, rescue services in natural disasters or emergencies, and to service the community.

== Appearance ==
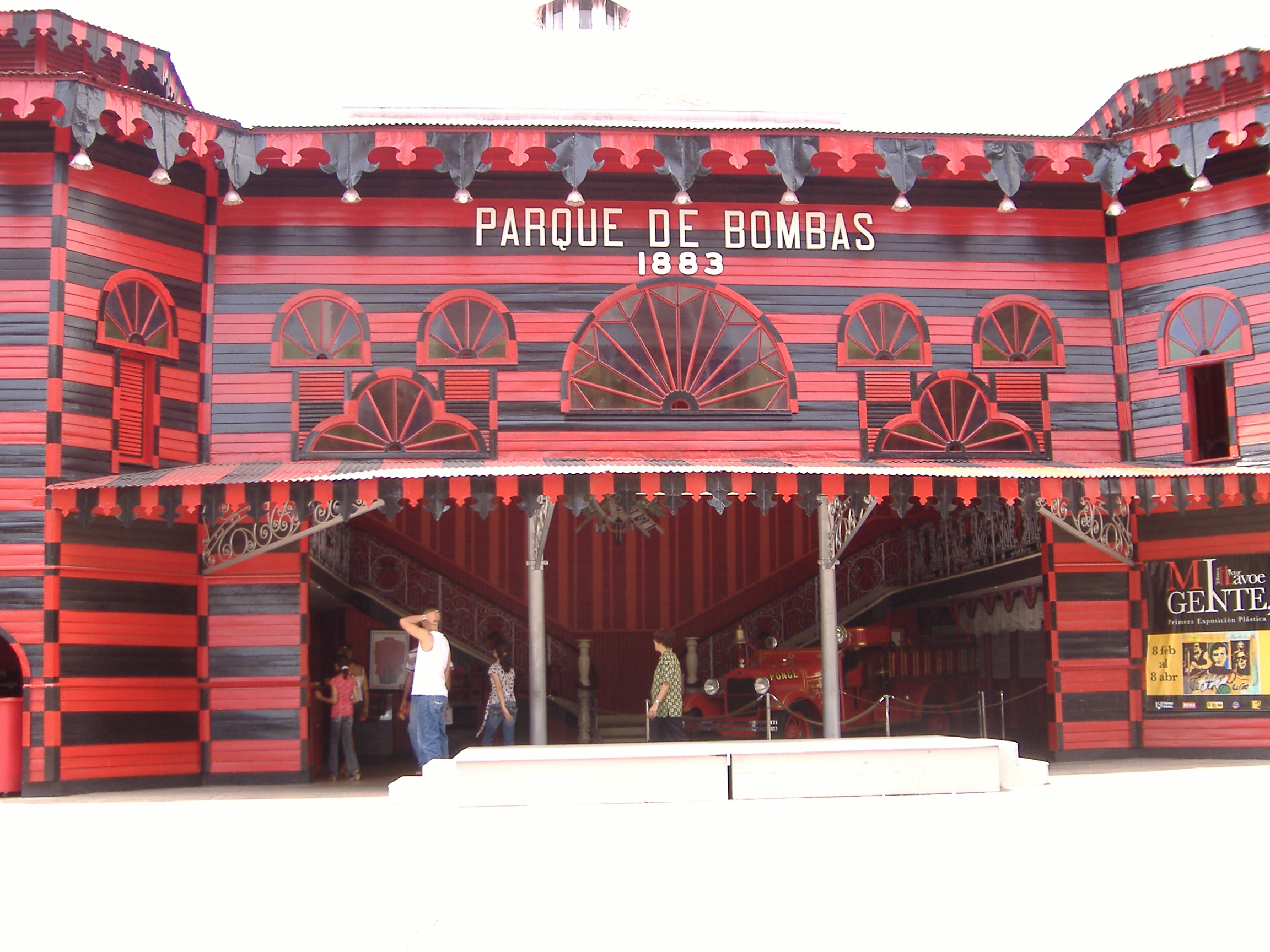
Front view of the firehouse

The basic structure measure 65'-8" in width by 26'-3" in length. It is two stories high with a tower at each corner of the Calle Marina front facade. The building is located in the city's central "Las Delicias Plaza" and it is attached to the Cathedral of Ponce at its rear boundary. Structurally, it is a wooden frame building with a pitched roof covered with galvanized zinc sheets. Exterior cladding is horizontal 1" by 6" wooden siding. Doors and windows are wooden. The windows are of the fixed louvered type, long, narrow, and crowned by an oversized fixed fan light.

The building's layout is a large, central space, flanked by two lateral towers, two stories in height, which opens to the main central area. The main central area is used as garage facilities for the fire trucks, and the two lateral towers are used as living quarters and exhibition areas. An elegant central two-sided stairway with elaborated cast iron railing leads to a mezzanine area used as administrative offices. Some interior partitions were removed from the first floor when the structure was altered for its new use as a firehouse in order to accommodate the machinery. The building has been kept in good condition throughout the years.

== Architecture ==
Meana designed the building with a strong Moorish influence, including its basic rectangular plan with towers at its front corners, its ornate façade, its long and narrow windows with fans at its top and its bright colored paint scheme. Gothic Revival architecture was also an influence. The building is painted red and black, Ponce's official colors. The interior is also very colorful, with vertical stripes of red and orange on the walls and a painted frieze with a fireman's motif.

== Museum ==
After 108 years of service, Parque de Bombas was vacated by the Puerto Rico Firefighters Corps in 1990. It was converted into a museum of firefighting. The architect in charge of its restoration was Pablo Ojeda O'Neill. The newer fire station was taken over by the Instituto de Música Juan Morel Campos in 2008. Ponce's central fire station is now located 1 km east of Parque de Bombas on Miguel Pou Boulevard.

== In popular culture ==
The firehouse is featured on the front cover of La Sonora Ponceña's LP salsa album titled "Fuego en el 23!".

== Gallery ==
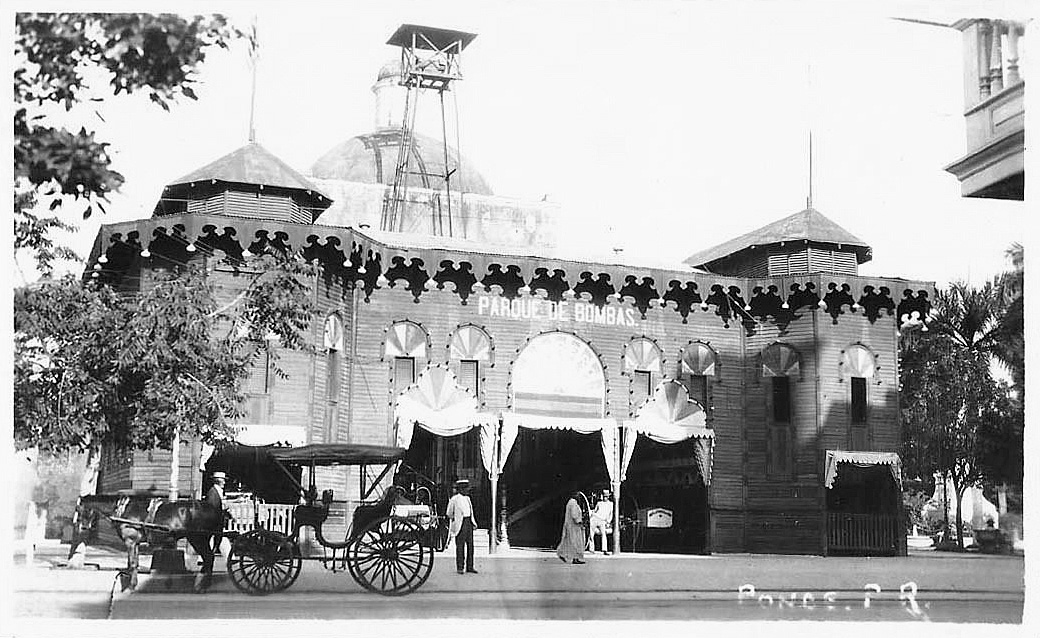
Parque de Bombas, photo of 1920

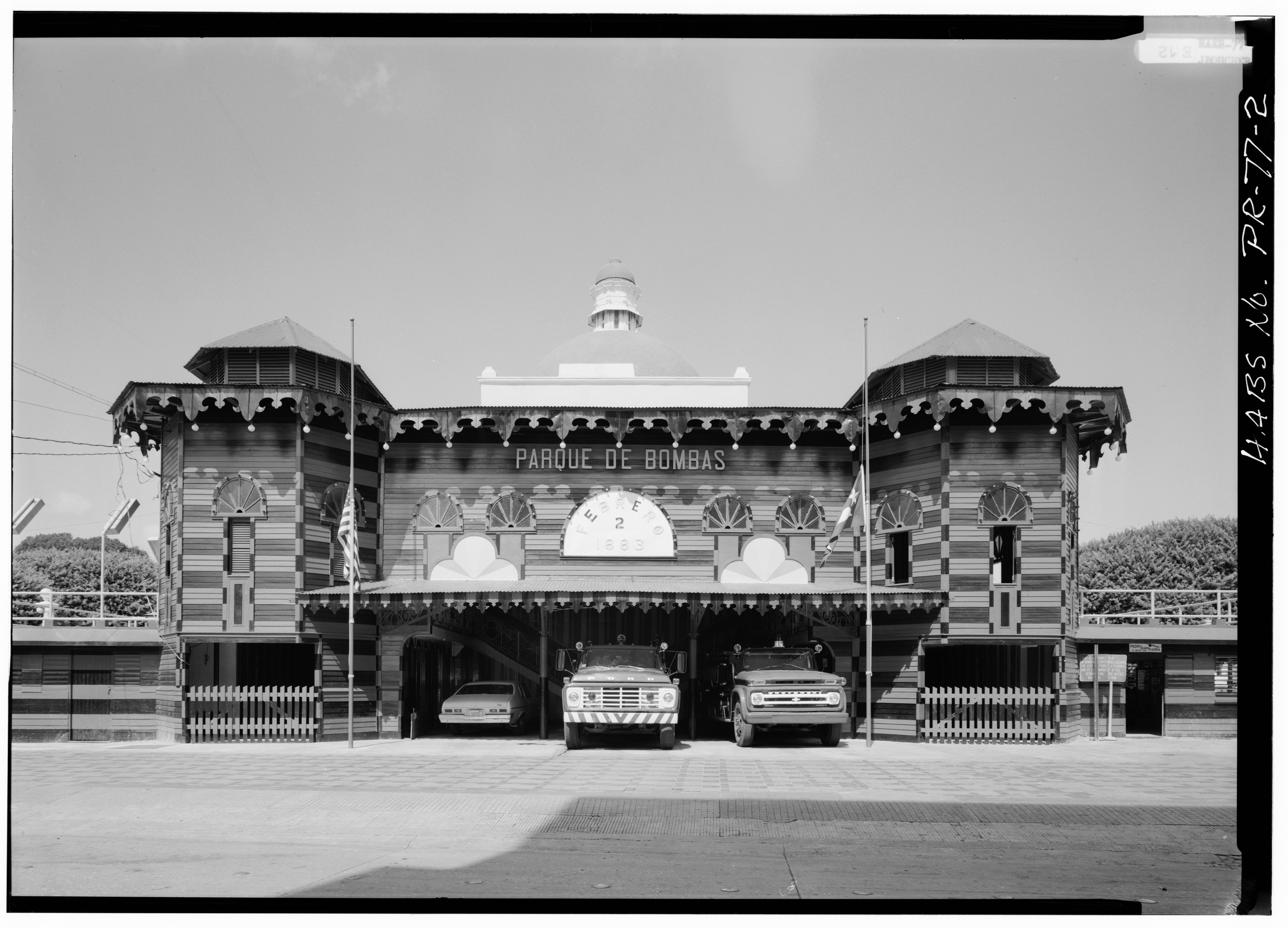
Parque de Bombas, 1977. Library of Congress.

== See also ==
- Monumento a los heroes de El Polvorín (obelisk)
- Monumento a los heroes de El Polvorín (tomb)
- Museo Parque de Bombas
- Calle 25 de Enero
- Ponce High School
