= Juan José Potous =

Mayor of Ponce, Puerto Rico

97th Mayor of Ponce, Puerto Rico
- In office 12 July 1895 – 10 May 1896
- Preceded by: Félix Saurí y Vivas
- Succeeded by: Luis Alvarado

Personal details
- Born: ca. 1845
- Died: ca. 1920
- Profession: Public servant

Juan José Potous y de la Lastra (ca. 1845 – ca. 1920) was Mayor of Ponce, Puerto Rico, from 12 July 1895 to 10 May 1896.

== Mayoral term ==
Upon the death of mayor Eduardo Armstrong, the governor of Puerto Rico named Juan José Potous, without waiting for the triplet recommendation from the Municipal Council. His main focus as mayor was to maintain a clean and neat look to the city. To that effect, he published guidelines for issues as mundane as the painting of the exterior of homes and the construction and installation of yard fences. He also addressed matters related to public health and hygiene. On 20 January 1896, he instituted detailed procedures for the celebration of wakes in people's homes. His oversaw a municipal government that ran smoothly thanks to his thorough knowledge of public administration.

Potous is best remembered for his relentless interest in completing the construction of Hospital Civil de Ponce (Ponce Civil Hospital), an annex/enlargement to Hospital Tricoche, that had been started in 1885. Many city streets were finished into macadam surfaces under his administration. Ermelindo Salazar, Bartolo Mayol, and Francisco Maria Franceschi were the lead contributors to the new hospital wing. He also engaged in the beautification of the city as well as in advancing the cause of public education.

== Resignation ==
On 23 March 1896, Potous imposed a fine on the director of "La Libertad" newspaper for printing false claims regarding the war that Spain was waging in Cuba. Then the next day the paper printed an editorial attacking Potous. The paper subsequently also printed another editorial titled "El Hombre Lúgubre" (The depressed man) and, knowing it referred to him, Potous had the paper's director jailed and required bail payment of $4000 Spanish pesetas. Given this state of affairs and with a preference of not having to deal with what he considered were unjust attacks on a public servant, Potous took advantage of an offer made to him to become director of the Mayagüez-Lares railroad, presented his resignation to the governor and left Ponce for his new job in western Puerto Rico.

== See also ==
- List of Puerto Ricans
- List of mayors of Ponce, Puerto Rico

Political offices
Preceded by Félix Saurí y Vivas	Mayor of Ponce, Puerto Rico; 12 July 1895 - 10 May 1896	Succeeded by Luis Alvarado
