= Rafael de Zárate y Sequera =

Mayor of Ponce, Puerto Rico

86th Mayor of Ponce, Puerto Rico
- In office 11 June 1884 – 16 July 1886
- Preceded by: Máximo de Meana y Guridi
- Succeeded by: Ramón Elices Montes

Personal details
- Born: ca. 1824
- Died: ca. 1904

Rafael de Zárate y Sequera (ca. 1824 – ca. 1904) was Mayor of Ponce, Puerto Rico, from 11 June 1884 to 16 July 1886.

== Mayoral term ==
During his two-year mayoral term, Zárate y Sequera is credited with placing fire hydrants along the route (Note: this route is today's Avenida Hostos) from downtown Ponce to its Port at Playa de Ponce and enlarging Calle León further up northbound, both completed in 1884. He is also credited with starting construction of Hospital Civil de Ponce (Note: Hospital Civil de Ponce (Ponce Civil Hospital), was the name given to an annex/enlargement wing to Hospital Tricoche. Ermelindo Salazar, Bartolo Mayol, and Francisco Maria Franceschi were the lead contributors to the new hospital wing. See, Museo de la Historia de Ponce. Health Hall. March 2011.) on 4 June 1885.

While Zárate Sequera did achieve these goals, the Hospital Civil was not completed, only one of its two wings was. In addition, he had a bad temper and it did not take long before he started to lose the support of both Municipal Council members and the townspeople at large. Given this state of affairs, he presented his resignation to the Governor and, on 16 July 1886 he made the announcement that the Governor had named Elices Montes to replace him. The Municipal Council reacted by stating that, though they respected the decision of the Governor, they were disappointed as three council members, namely, Juan Mayoral, Joaquin P. Valdivieso, and Federico Leon y Cortes, were qualified for the position. In addition, it was argued, Mr. Elices Montes was "a stranger" to Ponce politics and municipal administration. As a consequence, the municipal council approved a resolution that condemned the appointment of Elices Montes for mayor.

== See also ==
- List of Puerto Ricans
- List of mayors of Ponce, Puerto Rico

== Notes ==
Political offices
Preceded by Máximo de Meana y Guridi	Mayor of Ponce, Puerto Rico; 11 June 1884 – 16 July 1886	Succeeded by Ramón Elices Montes
