= Miguel Rosich y Más =

Mayor of Ponce, Puerto Rico

92nd Mayor of Ponce, Puerto Rico
- In office 8 May 1889 – 31 March 1890
- Preceded by: Vicente de Solivares y Miera
- Succeeded by: Carlos Eusebio de Ayo

99th Mayor of Ponce, Puerto Rico
- In office 1 April 1897 – 1897
- Preceded by: Luis Alvarado
- Succeeded by: Luis Gautier

Personal details
- Born: ca. 1830 Majorca, Spain
- Died: 24 January 1907 Ponce, Puerto Rico
- Spouse: Margarita Alomar
- Children: Olimpia, Julio, Jose, Teresa, Angela, Elisa, Herminia, and Arturo
- Profession: Accountant

Miguel Rosich y Más (ca. 1830 – 24 January 1907) was Mayor of Ponce, Puerto Rico, from 8 May 1889 until 31 March 1890, and again in 1897, starting on 1 April 1897.

== Early years ==
Rosich y Más was born around year 1830 in Majorca, Spain, to Cayetano Rosich and Angela Más. He married Margarita Alomar with whom he had eight children: Olimpia, Julio, Jose, Teresa, Angela, Elisa, Herminia, and Arturo. In 1864 he founded Liceo de San Antonio de Abad.

== Background ==
Rosich y Más is best remembered for what he did for Ponce as a non-citizen more than what did as mayor. He is remembered for having conceptualized, in 1877 the creation of a Fair in Ponce modeled after the Paris Fair of 1855 and, subsequently, in 1878, the main city square and streets were electrified, just like Paris, on the first day of the fair. The great fair in Ponce took place in 1882 and Parque de Bombas was built then and left as a legacy until today.

== First mayoral term (1889) ==
Upon the resignation of mayor Soliveres, Governor Pedro Ruiz Dana appointed Francisco Roubert, but Roubert could not accept the position due to failing health. Rosich y Más was then appointed mayor. Just like Roubert's appointment, Rosich was named mayor based on the recommendation of the Ponce municipal Council. Rosich y Mas was Ponce's first "popular mayor". He was both mayor and chairman of the Municipal Council.

With moneys left by his predecessor, Rosich y Mas made enhancements to the Municipal Jail, repair sidewalks in Plaza Principal (today's Plaza Degetau) and Plaza Delicias (today's Plaza Munoz Rivera), repaired many city streets, expanded Hospital Tricoche, repaired the roof of the "Kiosko Árabe" in Plaza Principal (today's Plaza Degetau), and built Calle Atocha as a macadam roadway and its sidewalks.

In 1890, Rosich donated a large collection of books from his personal library to the newly founded Ponce Municipal Library. Upon governor Pedro Ruiz Dana leaving office, mayor Rosich y Más presented his resignation as mayor.

After leaving office, and in politically-motivated move, the new mayor, Carlos Eusebio Ayo in collaboration with the new governor, General José Lasso y Pérez, via his Chief of Staff Leopoldo Cano, accused former mayor Rosich and his entire municipal council of embezzling 100,000 pesos, which led to their arrest and jailing. The news of the alleged embezzlement ran in all major European newspapers. The entire town, aware of the honesty and integrity of the public servants jailed and the injustice being committed, petitioned the judge to establish a bail amount equivalent to the amount of the alleged embezzlement, and within hours the town had collected the amount necessary to get former mayor Rosich, and a few of his Councilmen released. When the matter was finally heard in Court, on 27 April 1897, Rosich and all the defendants were found not guilty.

== Second mayoral term (1897) ==
During his second term in office, Rosich was mayor starting on 1 April 1897. During this second term, he was mayor for some 8 months. Considering the Decree of Autonomy granted to Puerto Rico (25 November 1897) shortly after he took office, his advanced age and health issues, he resigned to the post "and retired to his home peacefully and honorably."

== Death and legacy ==
Rosich died in Ponce on 24 January 1907. In Ponce's Barrio Segundo there is a street named after him called "Calle Rosich" located between Calle Mendez Vigo and Calle Union, and facing the north side of Terminal de Transportación Pública Carlos Garay.

== See also ==
- List of Puerto Ricans
- List of mayors of Ponce, Puerto Rico

Political offices
Preceded by Vicente de Solivares y Miera	Mayor of Ponce, Puerto Rico; 8 May 1889 - 31 March 1890	Succeeded by Carlos Eusebio de Ayo
Preceded by Luis Alvarado	Mayor of Ponce, Puerto Rico; 1 April 1897 - 1897	Succeeded by Luis Gautier
