= Juan de Ponte =

Mayor of Ponce, Puerto Rico

90th Mayor of Ponce, Puerto Rico
- In office 5 January 1888 – 4 April 1888 (Note: Félix Pubill (La Administración Municipal de Ponce, p. 33) states De Ponce called a meeting of the Municipal Council on 6 April 1888. Thus, it appears De Ponte may have actually finished his term past the date stated by Eduardo Neumann Gandía.)
- Preceded by: Fernando Diez de Ulzurrún y Somellera
- Succeeded by: Vicente de Solivares y Miera

Personal details
- Born: c. 1828
- Died: c. 1908
- Occupation: Harbormaster

Juan de Ponte (c. 1828 – c. 1908) was interim Mayor of Ponce, Puerto Rico, from 5 January 1888 to 4 April 1888.

== Background ==
De Ponte had been harbormaster at the Port of Ponce and was one of a group of citizens who labored extensively to bring a water pipeline from the Acueducto de Ponce in the city proper to serve the needs for potable water at Barrio Playa. He was recruited to serve as mayor from his work as a harbourmaster at the Port of Ponce.

== Mayoral term ==
His mayoral tenure was from 5 January to 4 April 1888—a short 90 days. He was named provisional mayor of Ponce until a permanent mayor could be appointed. Nothing significant occurred during his 3-month stay as mayor. Upon De Ponte presenting his resignation, the Municipal Council presented three names for his replacement: Juan Seix, Luis Gautier, and Santiago Oppenheimer.

== See also ==
- List of Puerto Ricans
- List of mayors of Ponce, Puerto Rico

== Notes ==
Political offices
Preceded by Fernando Diez de Ulzurrún y Somellera	Mayor of Ponce, Puerto Rico; 5 January 1888 – 4 April 1888	Succeeded by Vicente de Solivares y Miera
