= Elices =

Elices is a Spanish surname. Notable people with the surname include:

- Hermenegildo Elices (1914–1964), Spanish footballer
- Manuel Elices Calafat (born 1938), Spanish engineer and physicist
- Ramón Elices Montes (1844–1915), Puerto Rican politician and Mayor of Ponce
