= Museo Parque de Bombas =

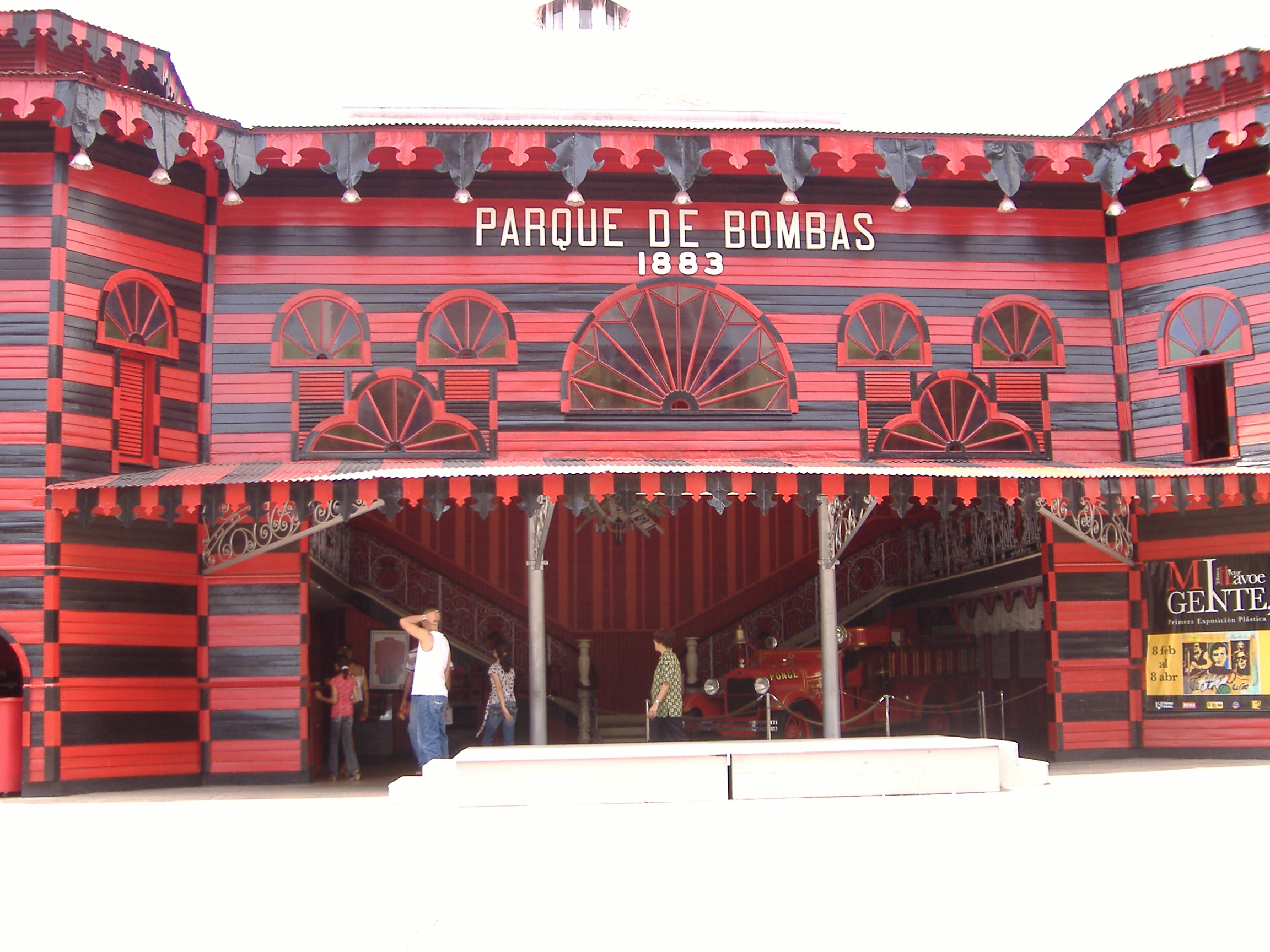
- Museo Parque de Bombas (Parque de Bombas firehouse museum) on Plaza Las Delicias

- Location within Puerto Rico
- Established: 1990
- Location: Plaza Las Delicias, Ponce, Puerto Rico
- Coordinates: 18°00′43″N 66°36′49″W
- Type: Firefighting museum
- Collections: Equipment, Records, and Dispatch & Transportation
- Visitors: 88,837 (2000)
- Founder: Rafael Cordero Santiago
- Curator: Arch. Pablo Ojeda O'Neill
- Owner: Autonomous Municipality of Ponce
- Public transit access: SITRAS
- Website: Website

Museo Parque de Bombas (Parque de Bombas Museum) is a museum located inside the historic Parque de Bombas in the Ponce Historic Zone in Ponce, Puerto Rico.

This museum is located at the Plaza Las Delicias town square, directly behind the Ponce Cathedral. It is housed in a building that once housed the city's main (and, initially, its only) firehouse. The building where the museum is located, has been heralded both for its historical and architectural roles in Puerto Rican society. Historically, it was Puerto Rico's first ever fire station. The building is listed in the National Register of Historic Places.

As municipal firehouses in Puerto Rico were reorganized into a commonwealth-level agency in 1943, called the Firemen Services of Puerto Rico, a more modern spacious firehouse was built in the 1960s a block from Parque de Bombas. The new modern firehouse, now itself occupied by Instituto de Música Juan Morel Campos, displaced the now-historic Parque de Bombas into more of a supportive and administrative firefighting role, whereas the new firehouse, located at Calle Cristina and Calle Mayor streets, became the main firehouse for the town.

In 1990, after 108 years of uninterrupted service as a firehouse, the Parque de Bombas firehouse was turned into the Museo Parque de Bombas. The museum traces the people and events of the Ponce firefighters throughout its history. The museum opened under the administration of Mayor Rafael Cordero Santiago. The architect who rebuilt and reconditioned the structure into a museum in 1990 was Pablo Ojeda O'Neill. At over 100,000 visitors per year, it is Ponce's most visited museum, and Puerto Rico's second most visited landmark, after Castillo El Morro.

== History ==
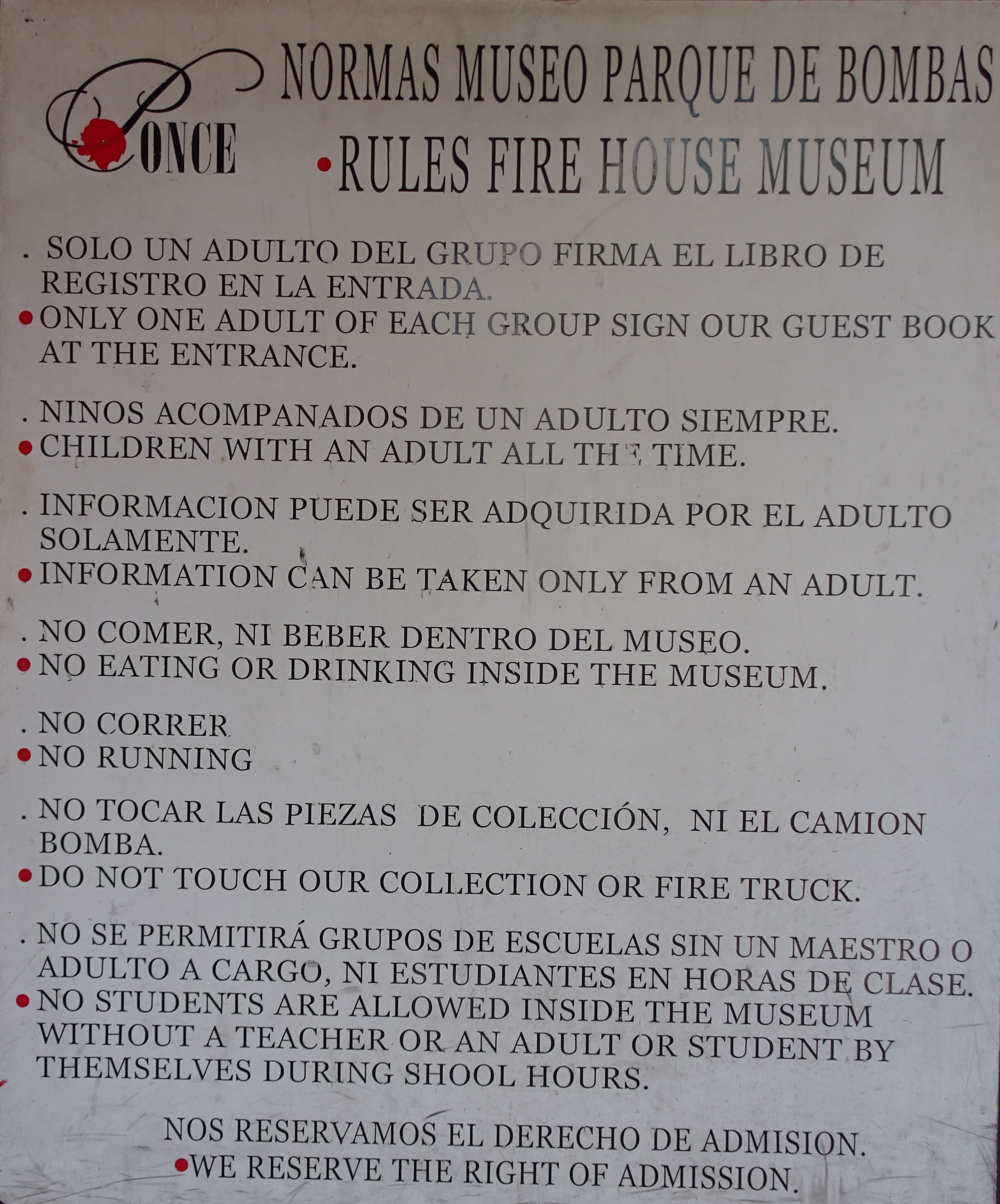
Museum Admission Rules

External audio
- You may see a video of Museo Parque de Bombas and Plaza Las Delicias HERE

The structure housing the museum was built in 1881, as the main exhibit pavilion for the 1882 Exhibition Trade Fair. A Spanish Army soldier, Lt. Colonel Maximo de Meana y Guridi who was also a trained architect, was commissioned in Puerto Rico at the time. The Madrid-based central government assigned Meana the task of designing and constructing the building. The building was unveiled during the 1882 Ponce Fair. The Fair's participants used the building as its main pavilion. The first brigade of firemen to work in the building were stationed there on 2 February 1883.

The station continued to serve the city of Ponce until 1990, ending its 108-year history as an active fire station. On that year, the station's fire-fighting duties were transferred to the more spacious fire station at Calle Cristina and Calle Mayor streets, and the building was officially converted into a fire-fighting museum. The restoration of the building into a museum took place under the guidance of Pablo Ojeda O'Neill, an experienced local museum curator. Restoration cost was US$140,000. Nowadays, a photo of the 1883 firefighters hangs on the walls of Museo Parque de Bombas. In 1983, the 100th anniversary of the brigade's victory over the infamous fire was commemorated at the station. Various artifacts used by the 1882 fire brigade are on display at the museum. Among these are some artifacts used to combat the 1899 "El Polvorín" fire. There are also artifacts of historical significance. Even before its 1990 closure, the station had already become a major tourist attraction, and some of the firemen would give visitors free station tours voluntarily when they were not attending to emergencies. The Ponce firefighters' museum is still known generally as Parque de Bombas and, according to some estimates, it is one of Ponce's most visited tourist attractions.

== Exhibitions ==
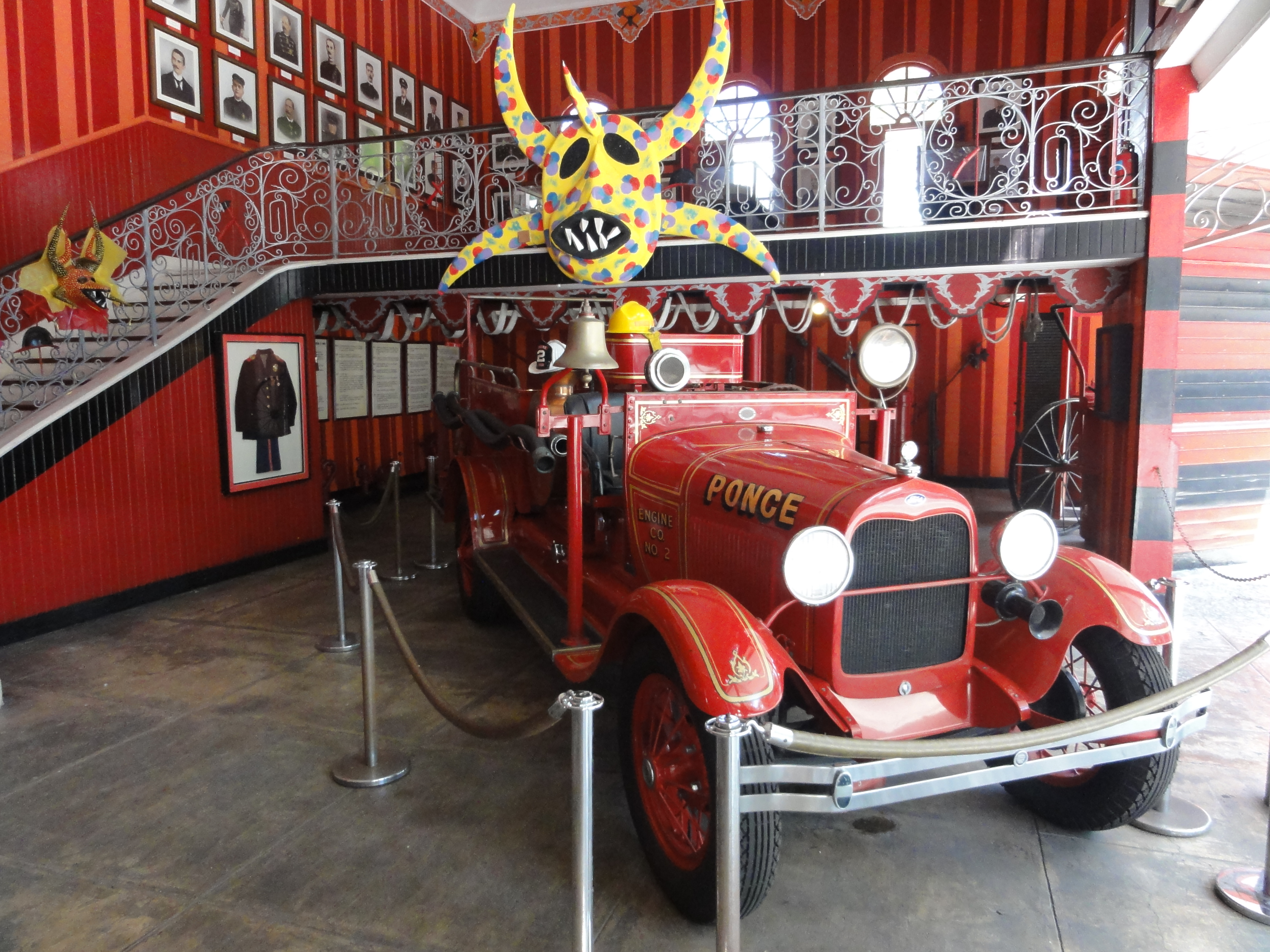
Antique fire truck at the Museum

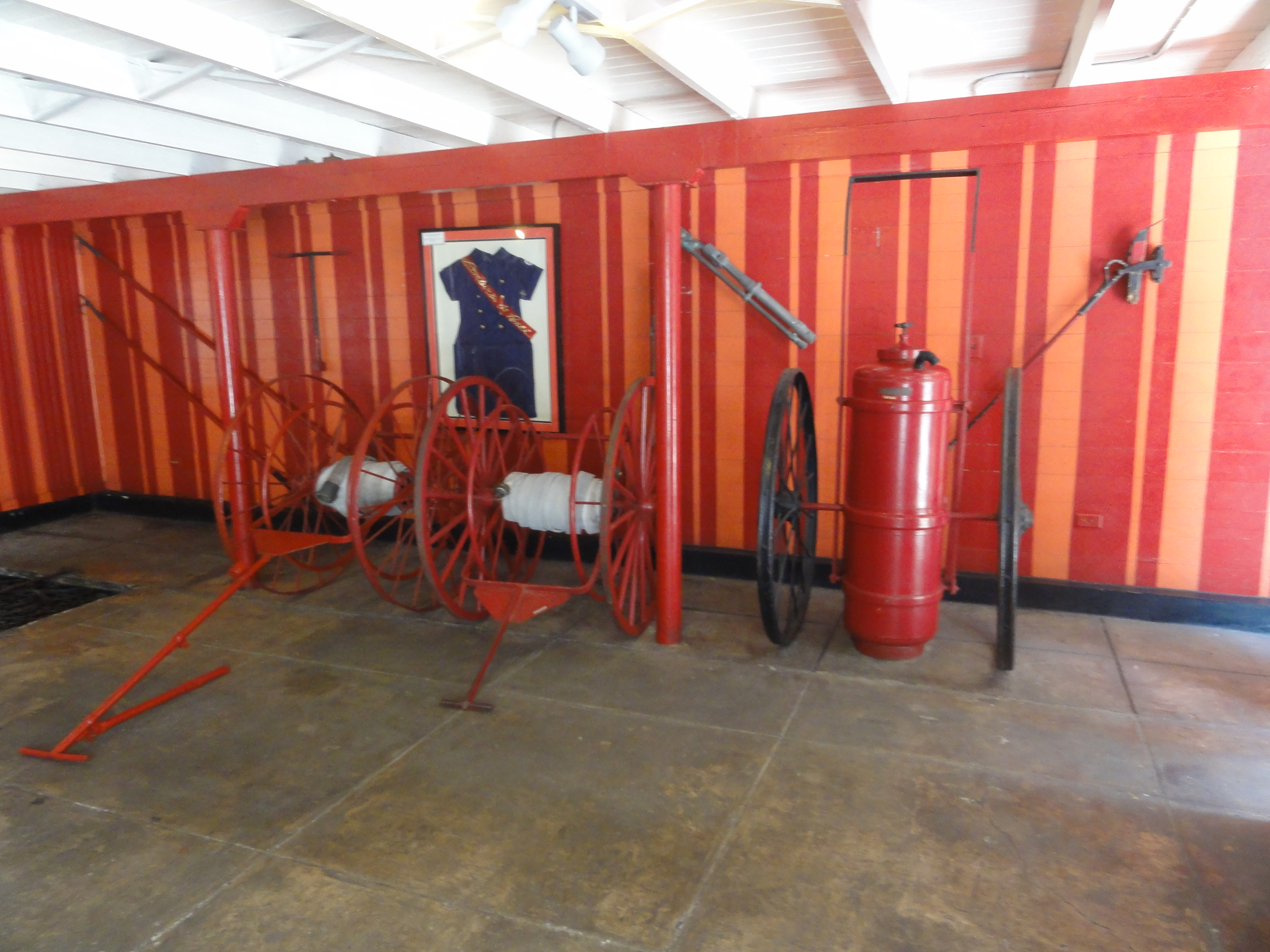
Fire fighting equipment of former fire fighters at the Museum

The exhibitions in the museum are divided into three major halls. The Dispatch and Transportation Hall is located on the first floor, and the Equipment Hall and the Historical Records Hall are on the second floor.

=== Dispatch and transportation hall ===
This hall consists of a small dispatch area showing the place with the firefighter officer where emergency calls were received and relayed to the firefighting personnel (their sleeping quarters were on the upstairs floor) as well as the equipment used in fighting fires in the 19th and first half of the 20th century. Located here are some of the pumps used to hand pump the water during a fire. Also here is an old firetruck dating from the first half of the 20th century. As a museum, the old dispatch area is now used as the museum's visitors' reception area.

=== Firefighting equipment hall ===
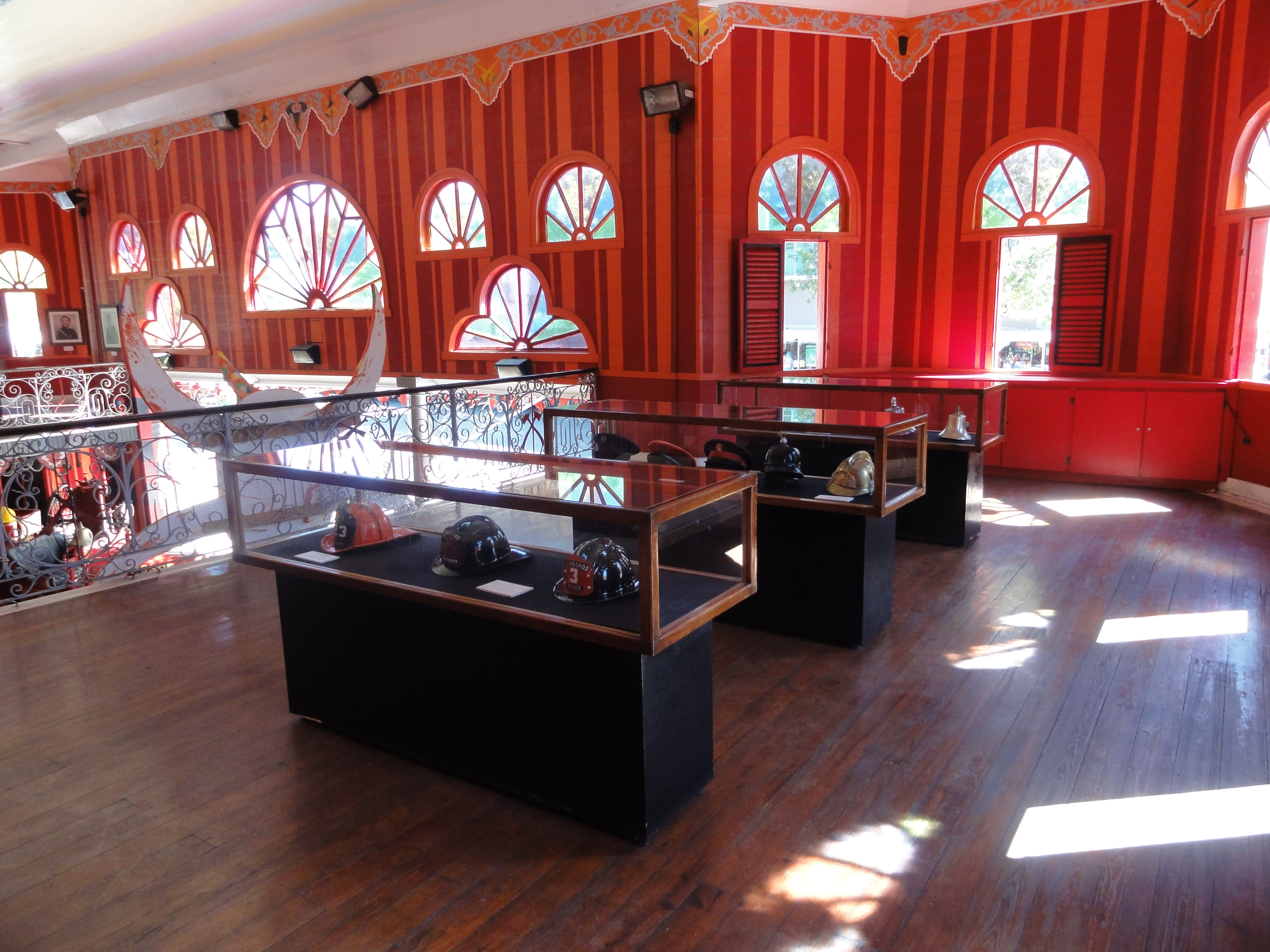
Fire equipment at Museum

This Hall is located on the southern side of the museum's second floor and, when the firehouse was operational, it was part of the firefighters' sleeping quarters. Located here are original axes, picks, bells, bugles and other such equipment as was used when the firehouse was fully operational in the nineteenth and first half to mid twentieth century. There are several firefighter uniforms, including their official Ponce Firefighters patch, as well as accompanying helmets and boots.

=== Historical records hall ===
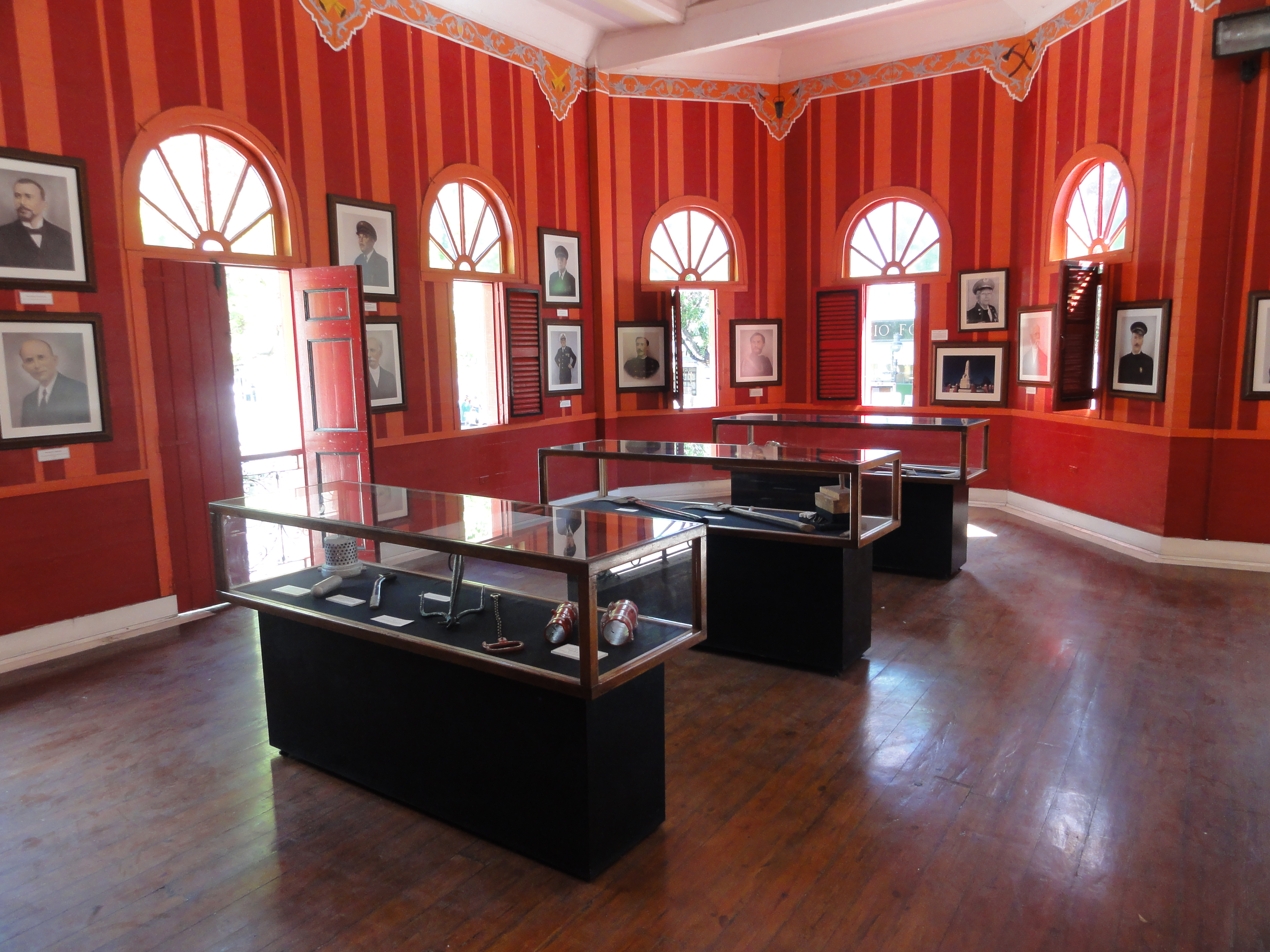
Fire history hall at the museum

This hall is located on the northern side of the museum's second floor, and it covers what was also part of the former sleeping quarters of the Ponce firefighters. In this hall the museum displays memorabilia related to the Ponce firefighters and their organizational structure. Through framed pictures, it traces the history of Ponce firefighters and some its major fires. Prominently displayed are group and individual pictures of the members of the Ponce Firefighters Corps. In addition to groups portraits of the firefighters corps visitors can see portraits of figures such as Firefighters Band director Domingo Cruz ("Cocolía") and firefighters medical director physician Dr. Rafael Pujals.

In 1820, two great fires affected the city of Ponce. One destroyed great part of the center of the city; and the other gutted 80% of Ponce's port zone, paralyzing all commercial trade to the southern section of Puerto Rico. This exhibit includes response to two major fires those that took place in the city in 1820, and in March 1845.

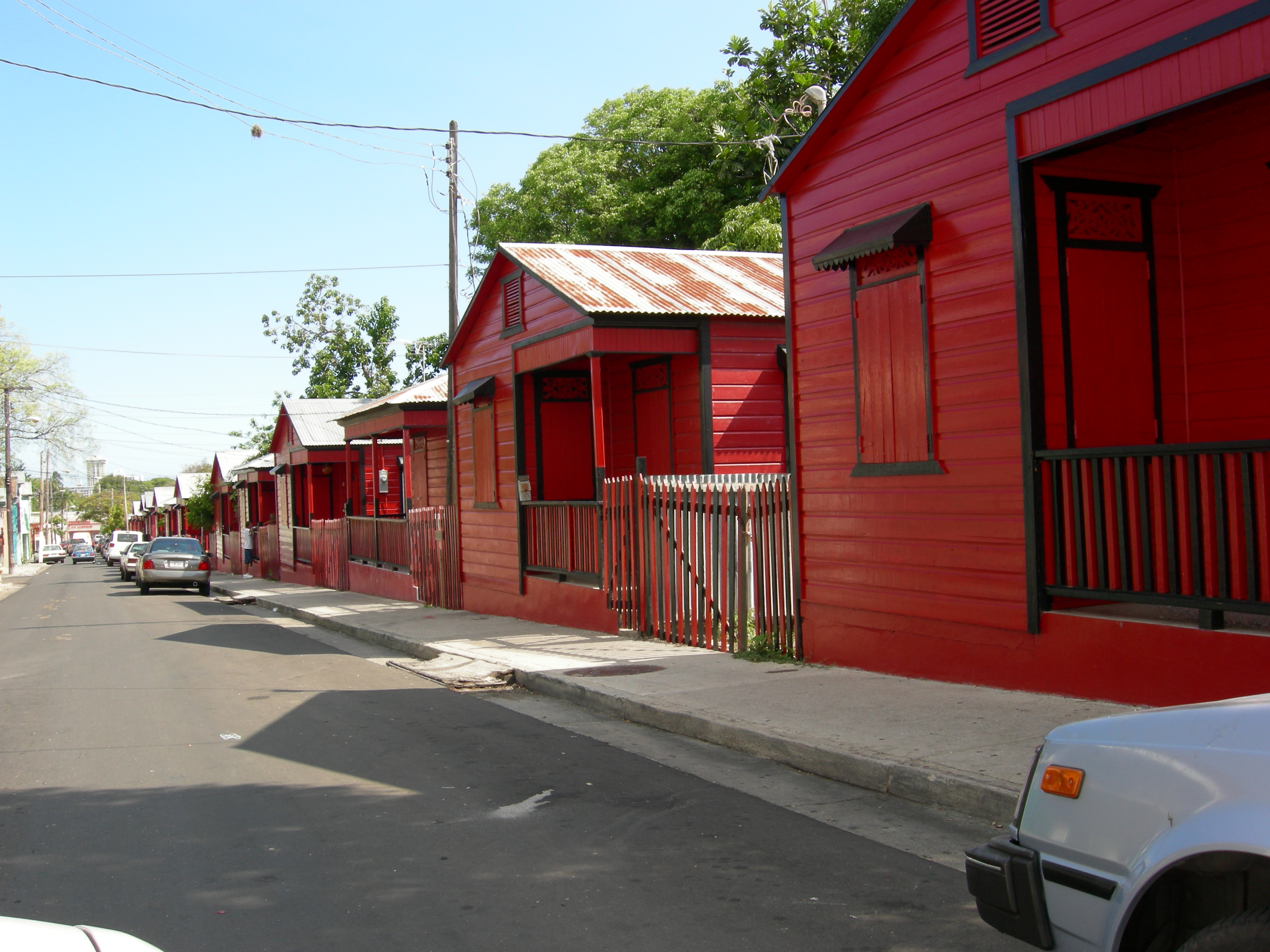
Firefighter homes on Calle 25 de Enero street (May 2006)

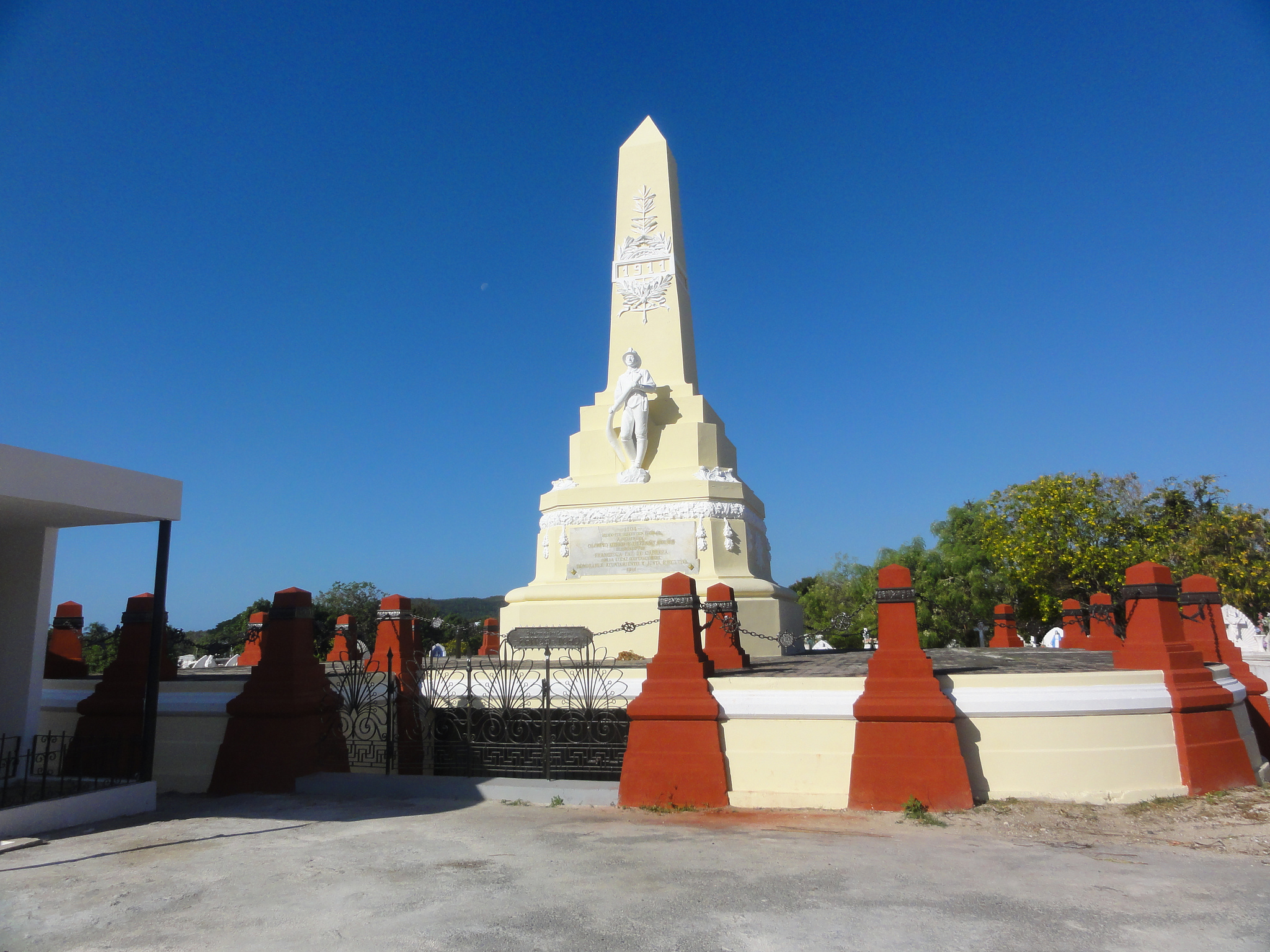
Firefighters mausoleum in Cementerio Civil de Ponce

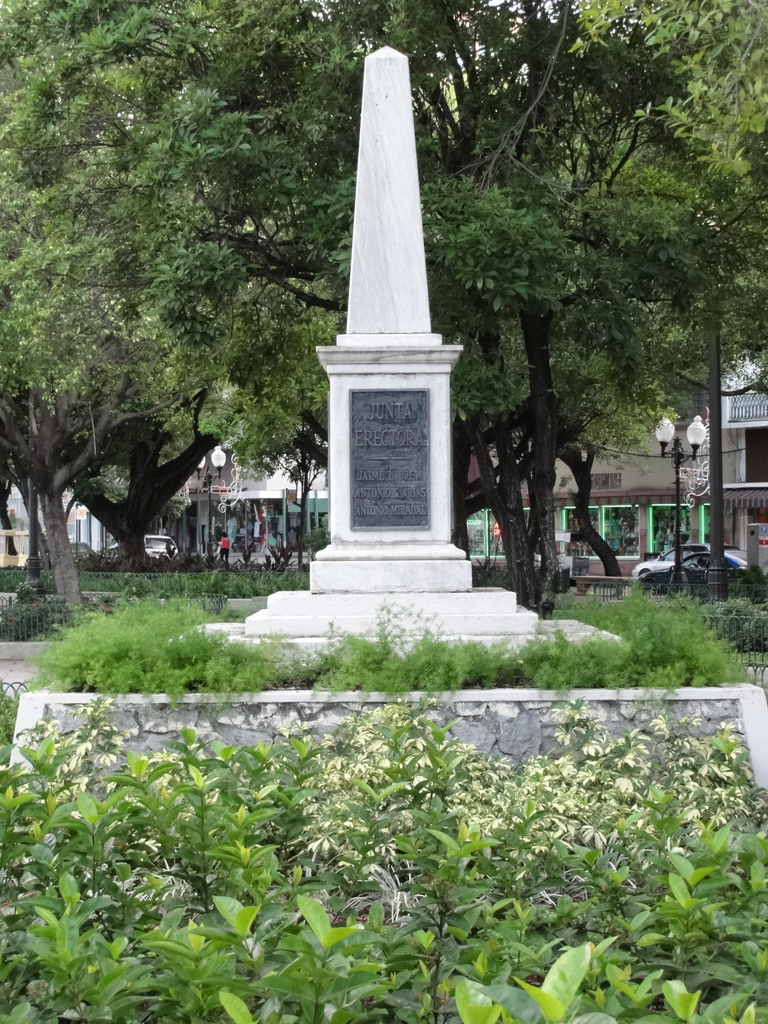
Obelisk to firefighters near the museum

Another large fire included in this exhibit is the one that occurred on 25 January 1899. This was a large fire (later dubbed "El Polvorin") which threatened the lives of Ponceños as well as the economy of Puerto Rico as a whole, given Ponce's de facto role as Puerto Rico's banking and agricultural capital. A painting in the Museo Parque de Bombas commemorates the heroic acts of seven courageous "bomberos" and one civilian who fought bravely against the voracious fire that threatened the region. Disobeying orders from the American troops that had recently taken control of Puerto Rico, the group was able to control the flames that had started inside the U.S. Army’s gunpowder reserves. For their courage, disaster was narrowly averted. For their success battling the fire, the group was honored many times both in Ponce and the rest of Puerto Rico. A few yards from Parque de Bombas, on Plaza Federico Degetau, sits an obelisk to their memory, and at the Cementerio Civil de Ponce (Ponce Civil Cemetery) a mausoleum was erected in 1911 to their memory where all seven heroes were eventually interred. Later on, the Parque de Bombas building was painted in Ponce's traditional city colors, red and black. A series of homes built a few years later for the firefighters and their families on 25 de Enero Street were also painted in these colors also.

A sad event in the history of this museum is the disappearance of an important historical document during 1975 restoration of Parque de Bombas. The document was the original (and so far only known copy) of the Proclamation of the "Heroes de El Polvorin" made by the Puerto Rico Legislative Assembly in 1906. In the Proclamation, seven firefighters and one civilian were declared heroes by Puerto Rico's highest national legislative body.

== See also ==
- Monumento a los heroes de El Polvorín (obelisk)
- Monumento a los heroes de El Polvorín (mausoleum)
- Parque de Bombas
- Calle 25 de Enero
