= Fernando Diez de Ulzurrún y Somellera =

Mayor of Ponce, Puerto Rico from 10 July 1887 to 4 January 1888

89th Mayor of Ponce, Puerto Rico
- In office 10 July 1887 – 4 January 1888
- Preceded by: Ermelindo Salazar
- Succeeded by: Juan de Ponte

Personal details
- Born: ca. 1837
- Died: ca. 1908
- Profession: Attorney

Fernando Diez de Ulzurrún y Somellera (Note: Socorro Girón spells Fernando Diez de Ulzurrún y Somellera's name differently ("Fernando Díez de Ulzurrum y Somellers", note the 4 differences, not just one), in "Ponce, el teatro La Perla y La Campana de la Almudaina", page 231. However, Eduardo Neumann Gandia, in "Verdadera y Autentica Historia de la Ciudad de Ponce" page 279, spells it "Fernando Diez de Ulzurrum y Somellera". In this article, it is spelled consistent with the spelling found in the oldest source available, Felix Pubill's La Administración Municipal de Ponce. (1900).) (ca. 1837 – ca. 1908) was Mayor of Ponce, Puerto Rico, from 10 July 1887 to 4 January 1888. Ulzurrún y Somellera mayored a city of 42,388 inhabitants.

== Background ==
Ulzurrún y Somellera was appointed mayor of Ponce while Pablo Ubarri's Partido Incondicional Español held a majority in Puerto Rico politics and Romualdo Palacio was governor of Puerto Rico. Ulzurrún y Somellera was governor Palacios's nephew-in-law.

== Mayoral term ==
Ulzurrún y Somellera is remembered for his fiscal accountability. Upon taking on the mayoral post, he soon realized the precarious state of the municipal bank accounts and that accounting books were not being properly kept. Suspecting money was being wasted, he instituted a safe box with three keys, and placed the box in his office. He handed out a key to the Municipal accountant and one to the Municipal depository and he kept the third key. He then required that money collected be place in the box on a daily basis, together will all associated receipts and accounting logs. Noting there continued to be a short in the funds, he demanded the difference from the Depositary in 24 hours or face a judge. Unable to provide the missing money, the Depositary left the country, and the Court subsequently found him guilty in absentia and ordered his arrest. Ulzurrún y Somellera then requested from the governor the forming of a commission that would review the earnings and expenditures of the municipality in the previous various years. The commission found there had been embezzlement of municipal funds and the Accountant also left the country. Having no one to perform the Accountant's and Depositary functions, municipal councilmen Luis Gautier and Juan Seix filled the posts on an interim basis. Unfortunately, Ulzurrún y Somellera mayored the municipality during the era of the Componte, a time during which Puerto Rican Autonomistas suffered political persecution. This resulted in mayor Ulzurrún y Somellera siding with his uncle-in-law which often meant abandoning some of his best practices regarding personal integrity. One such componte abuse was committed by the local law enforcement authorities against the highly regarded liberal journalist Francisco Cepeda, in the mayor's own office while the mayor watched the beating. Despite the public outcry for the event, as well as the order of disapproval by the Municipal Assembly, Ulzurrún y Somellera was not relieved of his mayoral position until his uncle-in-law's governorship had concluded at which point Palacios's componte practice also ended.

== See also ==
- List of mayors of Ponce, Puerto Rico
- List of Puerto Ricans

Political offices
| Preceded by Ermelindo Salazar | Mayor of Ponce, Puerto Rico; 10 July 1887 - 4 January 1888 | Succeeded by Juan de Ponte |
