= Luis Alvarado (mayor) =

Mayor of Ponce, Puerto Rico

Luis Alvarado y González

98th Mayor of Ponce, Puerto Rico
- In office 11 May 1896 – 28 March 1897
- Preceded by: Juan José Potous
- Succeeded by: Miguel Rosich y Más

Personal details
- Born: c. 1846
- Died: c. 1916
- Occupation: Military

Luis Alvarado y González (c. 1846 – c. 1916) was Mayor of Ponce, Puerto Rico, from 11 May 1896 to 28 March 1897. He was the commanding officer in town installed by the military government in Puerto Rico at the time (1896).

== Mayoral term ==
Alvarado González was a prominent artillery commander in Ponce with great speaking skills, but had no knowledge of public administration at the time of his appointment as mayor in May 1896. His administrative and municipal council meetings always finished within the hour because, in advance of his meetings, he had already gained whatever support was need to approve of reject proposals. As such he managed to run council meetings were peace and harmony reigned.

He had the municipal government prepare for and carry out a celebration for the Las Mañanitas festivities on 12 December 1896 which was well received by the townspeople. He will also be remembered for his unwavering support for the founding of the Casino de Ponce.

== Resignation ==
He resigned less than a year as mayor to return to his work in the military in San Juan. He later returned to Ponce in his role as Delegado del Gobernador Civil (Representative of the Civil Governor).

== See also ==
- List of Puerto Ricans
- List of mayors of Ponce, Puerto Rico

Political offices
Preceded by Juan José Potous	Mayor of Ponce, Puerto Rico; 11 May 1896 – 28 March 1897	Succeeded by Miguel Rosich y Más
