= José de Nouvilas de Vilar =

Soldier in the Spanish military; mayor of Ponce, Puerto Rico in 19th century

94th Mayor of Ponce, Puerto Rico
- In office 3 January 1893 (Note: Both Eduardo Neumann (Instituto de Cultura Puertorriqueña, 1913, p. 280) and Socorro Giron (Gobierno Municipal de Ponce, 1992, p. 284) state Nouvilas de Vilar took office on 3 January 1893. However, Felix Pubill (Tipografia de Jose Pico Matos, 1900, page 59) states he took office on 3 January 1892, which appears to be a typographical error.) – 9 August 1894
- Preceded by: Carlos Eusebio de Ayo
- Succeeded by: Eduardo Armstrong

Personal details
- Born: 1856 Mahón, Menorca, Spain
- Died: 1931 Valldemossa, Mallorca, Spain
- Spouse: Maria Lavinia Boothby Tolosa
- Occupation: Military

José de Nouvilas de Vilar (Note: Some sources (e.g., Neysa Rodriguez Deynes, Brevario Sobre la Historia de Ponce (2002) p.167, and Gobierno Municipal de Ponce's website (16 May 2006)) spell his name "José de Nonvilas de Vilar". Here "José de Nouvilas de Vilar" is used because it is consistent with the oldest sources available (Felix Pubill (1900) and Eduardo Neuman Gandia (1913)). There is a third spelling that has been found, "José de Nouvillas" (Socorro Giron's Ponce, el Teatro La Perla y La Campana de La Almudaina (1992), p. 301.), but since this third case is found in a reprint from a press (Imprenta de M. Lopez (M. Lopez Press) from 20 June 1894) for Nouvilas's 1895 Edict, it is discarded here as typographical press error. The spelling "José de Nouvilas de Vilar" is the spelling of his name as given by the oldest reference available, Felix Pubill's "La Administración Municipal de Ponce" (1900), p. 59, as well as by the second oldest source, Eduardo Neumann Gandia's Verdadera y Autentica Historia de la Ciudad de Ponce (1913), p. 279.) (1856 – 1931) was Mayor of Ponce, Puerto Rico, from 3 January 1893 to 9 August 1894. He was a soldier in the Spanish military and held the rank of "General de Brigada".

== Background ==
Nouvilas de Vilar had been Ponce Police Chief immediately prior to his first day as mayor. He had garnished the sympathy of the townspeople for his fair application of law enforcement, in particular for the treatment of residents during the popular and commercial protests of 7–10 September 1892 to the Madrid's tax increase. During these protests Nouvilas de Vilar had prohibited his police force from using any violence against the residents.

== Mayoral term ==
Nouvilas became mayor of Ponce on 3 January 1893 and he mayored the municipality until 9 August 1894. During this time he spearheaded the development of a working group of women for the creation of a shelter for Ponce's homeless elderly. In 1893, noticing the large number of elderly beggars that crowded the city streets, he had the urge that something needed to be done to help these group of people. A significant amount from the estate of Miguel Arribas was also donated to the municipality for this purpose. As a result of his leadership, and the many donations that came in, by November 1894 an Asilo de Ancianos (Shelter for the Elderly) opened at Calle Mendez Vigo #37. Later, encountering declining health, Nouvilas de Vilar traveled to the Peninsula for medical treatment, from where he resigned his mayoral post. However, under the pretext of public safety, he also ordered the "alcaldes de barrio" to "enter all private homes in their jurisdiction and assess their physical condition."

== Legacy ==
Nouvilas is remembered for issuing an anti-prostitution edict, the Reglamento de Higiene de la Prostitución (Prostitution Higiene Decree), intended to "correct immorality in Ponce".

== See also ==
- List of Puerto Ricans
- List of mayors of Ponce, Puerto Rico

== Notes ==
Political offices
Preceded by Carlos Eusebio de Ayo	Mayor of Ponce, Puerto Rico; 3 January 1893 – 9 August 1894	Succeeded by Eduardo Armstrong
