= Carlos Eusebio de Ayo =

Puerto Rican politician

93rd Mayor of Ponce, Puerto Rico
- In office 12 April 1890 – 2 January 1893
- Preceded by: Miguel Rosich y Más
- Succeeded by: José de Nouvilas de Vilar

Personal details
- Born: ca. 1830
- Died: ca. 1910

Carlos Eusebio de Ayo (Note: Mariano Vidal Armstrong spells his name "Eusebio de Aro[sic] y Rouez" (Mariano Vidal Armstrong. "Ponce: Notas para su Historia." Segunda Edición. 1986. San Juan, PR: Oficina de Conservación Histórica de Puerto Rico. p. 79.) While Vidal Armstrong's spelling is missing the "Carlos" first name, his contribution is significant in that none of the other historical sources with listings of Ponce mayors provides the second surname, Rouez.) (ca. 1830 – ca. 1910) was Mayor of Ponce, Puerto Rico, from 12 April 1890 - 2 January 1893.

== Mayoral term ==
Carlos Eusebio de Ayo Rouez was named mayor of Ponce by governor José Lasso y Pérez on 12 April 1890. While acting as mayor of Ponce, on 7 September 1892, all stores and shops in Ponce shut down in protest for the high tariffs imposed on commerce and industry. The conflict was resolved 3 days later, on 10 September.

Ayo is remembered as the mayor who liked to throw banquets for the governor and his staff whenever they visited the city of Ponce, and his public works were none. Mayor Ayo dependent heavily on his assistant, Secretary Joaquin Salgado, to make decisions and run city hall. To a point, the mayor was Salgado's puppet and. in a sense, it was his assistant Salgado who ran City Hall.

== See also ==
- List of Puerto Ricans
- List of mayors of Ponce, Puerto Rico

== Notes ==
Political offices
Preceded by Miguel Rosich y Más	Mayor of Ponce, Puerto Rico; 12 April 1890 - 2 January 1893	Succeeded by José de Nouvilas de Vilar
