= Ramón Elices Montes =

87th Mayor of Ponce, Puerto Rico
- In office c. 16 July 1886 – May 1887
- Preceded by: Rafael de Zárate y Sequera
- Succeeded by: Ermelindo Salazar

Personal details
- Born: 1844
- Died: ca. 1915
- Profession: Writer

Ramón Elices Montes (1844 – ca. 1915) was Mayor of Ponce, Puerto Rico, from 16 July 1886 to May 1887.

== Mayoral term ==
On 10 July 1886, Elices Montes (Note: According to Fay Fowlie de Flores (Ponce, Perla del Sur: Una Bibliográfica Anotada. Second Edition. 1997. Ponce, Puerto Rico: Universidad de Puerto Rico en Ponce. p. 327. Item 1636. LCCN 92-75480), "Elices" was Ramon Elices Montes's second name, not his surname. However, another authority, Ileana M. Rodriguez Silva (Silencing Race: Disentangling blackness, colonialism, and national identities in Puerto Rico. Palgrave Macmillan. 2012. p. 96. ISBN 9781137263216) refers to "Elices" as the mayor's first surname.) was appointed mayor of Ponce by the Central Government of the Province of Puerto Rico, and his appointment became effective on 16 July of that year. He is best remembered for having published a 14-page municipal status report where he laid out the state of municipality in eight areas: Municipal personnel, Municipal records, Treasury, Source of the municipal debt, Plan to liquidate the municipal debt, Education, Health, and Public works.

Acting as mayor during the General Assembly of the Partido Autonomista Puertorriqueño that took place at Teatro La Perla in 1887, he wrote a voluminous "Memoirs" of the event, which he submitted to the Governor.

In the 1880s, the city of Ponce faced a significant influx of black and brown migrants looking for work. Montes sought to suppress their movements, as he considered them "vagrants" and a threat to public order. He authorized the municipal police to perform almost constant surveillance of taverns, brothels, and gambling houses, keeping an eye out "for this sort of elements". This policy led to several uprisings, some notorious: "Unable to recognized that state suppression fueled popular uprisings, Elices depicted the autonomists as dangerous radicals." Elices Montes was a member of the Unconditional Spanish Party, and he blamed the opposition, the Liberal Reformists.

He is remembered for his interest in improving public education, having order numerous textbooks for the students in Ponce public schools. He was also able to repay old debts the municipal government was carrying over from previous administrations. His focus, though, was public education, to the point that maintenance of municipal streets and the development of public works suffered significantly. As a result, he was severely criticized by the press. He reacted by requesting a 4-month sick leave which was approved and he traveled to Spain for treatment. Teniente de alcalde (a sort of deputy mayor) Ermelindo Salazar, per the legal protocol in place at the time, filled in while Elices Montes was gone. Some time afterwards Elices Montes presented his resignation to the post of mayor from overseas. Salazar was a businessman and had other significant commitments which did not allow him the attend to the mayoral administration the way he wanted to, but addressed as many urgent matters as his time allowed him to until the next Alcalde appointed by the Governor, Fernando Diez de Ulzurrún y Somellera, took over.

== See also ==
- Ponce, Puerto Rico
- List of Puerto Ricans

== Notes ==
Political offices
Preceded by Rafael de Zárate y Sequera	Mayor of Ponce, Puerto Rico; 10 July 1886– May 1887	Succeeded by Ermelindo Salazar
