= Vicente de Soliveres y Miera =

Mayor of Ponce, Puerto Rico

91st Mayor of Ponce, Puerto Rico
- In office 4 April 1888 – 19 March 1889
- Preceded by: Juan de Ponte
- Succeeded by: Miguel Rosich y Más

Personal details
- Born: ca. 1838
- Died: ca. 1908
- Profession: Politician

Vicente de Soliveres y Miera (Note: Some sources (example, Encyclopedia Puerto Rico) spell this name "Vicente de Solivares y Miera". Here the spelling used is that used by the two oldest sources available (Eduardo Neumann Gandia's "Verdadera y Autentica Historia de la Ciudad de Ponce", (1913) p. 278; Felix Pubill's "La Administración Municipal de Ponce", (1900) p. 35.) (ca. 1838 – ca. 1908) was Mayor of Ponce, Puerto Rico, from 4 April 1888 to 19 March 1889.

== Background ==
Soliveres Miera had been mayor of San Juan before he was appointed mayor of Ponce.

== Mayoral term ==
Upon taking over as mayor, he announced the 16 Ponce residents chosen by the Governor who would make up the Municipal Council: Ramón Cortada, F. Marzan, P. Valdivieso, Miguel Rosich, Francisco Roubert, Basilio O. Diaz, Angel Fernandez, F. Fernandez, Narciso Arabia, Juan Serrallés, Pedro Hedilla, Santiago Oppenheimer, B. Garcia, Lazaro Puente, Jose Mirandes, Jaime Cotal, Francisco Barnes, Cosme Clavell, A. Subira, Jose Ferrer.

Soliveres Miera is best remembered for shutting down the newspaper La Revista de Puerto Rico in July 1888. Two months later, on 1 September 1888, strong rains caused Río Portugués to overflow its banks, and Soliveres help the victims of the floods. Soliveres Miera also oversaw the "Hermanas de la Caridad" (Sisters of the Charity) taking charge of the administration of the municipal hospital, Hospital Tricoche. Some of the public works by Soliveres are the building of a new municipal jail and of a concrete tower at Cerro del Vigía, the enlargement of the municipal offices, improvements made to the exiting jail to provide for living quarters for the prison officer, and the provisioning of sidewalks to several city streets.

== Resignation ==
Soliveres was liked by his employees and subordinates, "their relationship being more that of a friend than a boss." However, one night, upon orders from the governor, Soliveres dissolved the tertulia at Parque de Bombas because, it was rumored, that in it the provincial government was being criticized. From that point on the news media followed, analyzed and reported all his moves to the point the criticism became too much of a burden on the mayor. As a result, he presented his resignation to the governor and left for Spain. Still liked by many of the townspeople, Soliveres was wished a warm farewell along the way as he left the city and traveled the municipal portion of Carretera Central to San Juan.

== See also ==
- List of mayors of Ponce, Puerto Rico
- List of Puerto Ricans

Political offices
Preceded by Juan de Ponte	Mayor of Ponce, Puerto Rico; 4 April 1888 – 19 March 1889	Succeeded by Miguel Rosich y Más
