= Andrés Caparrós García =

Mayor of Ponce, Puerto Rico

84th Mayor of Ponce, Puerto Rico
- In office 1 October 1881 – 28 September 1882
- Preceded by: Juan José Cartagena
- Succeeded by: Maximo de Meana y Guridi

Personal details
- Born: ca. 1825
- Died: ca. 1900
- Profession: Politician

Andrés Caparrós García (c. 1825 – c. 1900) was Mayor of Ponce, Puerto Rico, from 1 October 1881 to 28 September 1882.

== Mayoral term ==
Caparrós García is best remembered because during his mayoral administration the city of Ponce came to be called "la villa de los jíbaros progresistas" (village of the progressive jíbaros). His term ended on 28 September 1882, when he went to San Juan to become mayor there.

== See also ==
- Ponce, Puerto Rico
- List of Puerto Ricans
- List of mayors of Ponce, Puerto Rico

Political offices
Preceded by Juan José Cartagena	Mayor of Ponce, Puerto Rico; 1 October 1881 – 28 September 1882	Succeeded by Maximo de Meana y Guridi
