= Máximo de Meana y Guridi =

85th Mayor of Ponce, Puerto Rico
- In office 28 September 1882 – 31 May 1884
- Preceded by: Andrés Caparrós y García
- Succeeded by: Rafael de Zárate y Sequera

Personal details
- Born: ca. 1840 Spain
- Died: ca. 1912 (Note: In his 1913 book, Eduardo Neumann Gandia states Meana Girudi was dead ("...el difunto Meana..."), which implies he must had died around 1912.) Rome
- Party: Partido Incondicional Español
- Profession: Soldier, Architect

Máximo de Meana y Guridi (ca. 1840 – ca. 1912) was a Spanish soldier and Mayor of Ponce, Puerto Rico, from 28 September 1882 until 31 May 1884. Meana y Guridi was interim mayor of Ponce from 28 September 1882 until 2 February 1883, and then mayor from 2 February 1883 until 31 May 1884. As a Spanish Army soldier, Maximo de Meana y Guridi held the rank of Lt. Colonel.

== Background ==
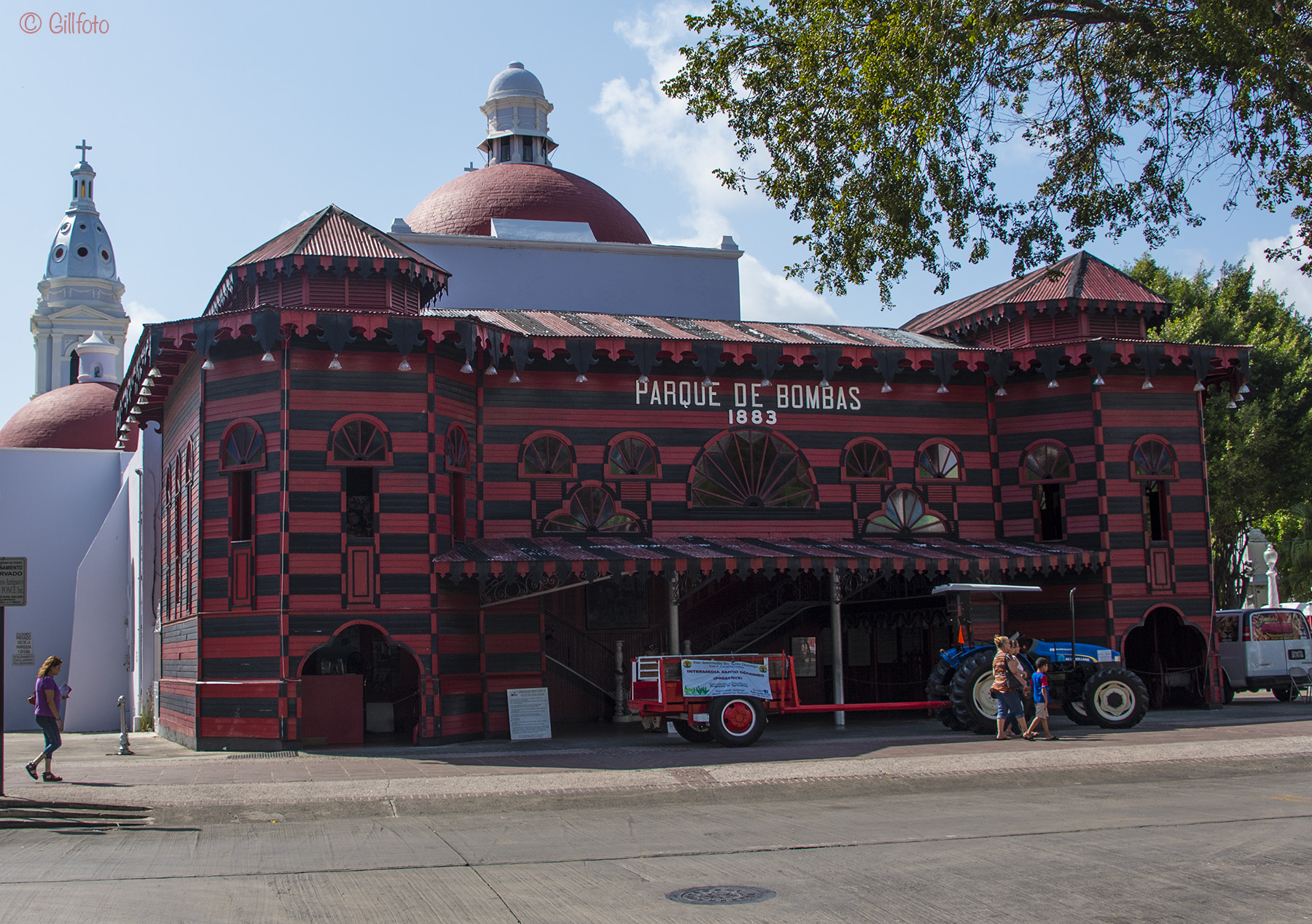
Structure designed by Meana for the 1882 Feria Exposición de Ponce, now the Museo Parque de Bombas

Meana Guridi is remembered more by something he did as a soldier than as a mayor: the design and building of the Main Pavilion of the 1882 Feria Exposición de Ponce, today Museo Parque de Bombas. He designed and built it because, besides being a soldier, Meana was also a professional architect. In addition, he oversaw the construction of the (now removed) kiosko árabe on Plaza Degetau, which was also an important building during the Exposición.

== Mayoral term ==
Puerto Rico's Spanish governor General Segundo de la Portilla Gutiérrez appointed Meana y Guridi to replace mayor Andrés Caparrós García who had left Ponce to serve as mayor of San Juan. The appointment was the result of suggestions made to the governor by members of the Ponce Municipal Assembly, after they had been positively impacted by Meana Guridi's involvement in the 1882 Feria Exposición de Ponce for which Meana had not only designed its Main Pavilion (now Parque de Bombas) but had also taken active part in the planning and operation of the Exposición itself as well. Meana Guridi completed Caparrós García's term, which expired on 2 February 1882, as alcalde delegado (interim mayor). On 2 February 1882, Meana Guridi then officially became mayor of the city, a post he held until 31 May 1884.

On 16 October 1882, the following were members of Meana's Municipal Council:

- Acisclo Subirá
- Fabriciano Fernández
- Antonio Pérez Guerra
- Bartolomé Mayol
- Juan Príncipe
- R. Aquiles Colón
- Ramón Rivera
- Juan Seix
- Fructuoso Bustamante
- Mariano Vidal
- Ignacio Bassedas
- J. Mirandez
- Juan Tur
- F. Marzan

Three events marked Meana's mayoralty in Ponce. The first one occurred on 2 January 1883, as he was entering into his first official term as non-interim mayor. On that date, during the official Municipal Council session, as the Municipal budget was being presented he increased the mayor's salary to $3,000 pesos, and increase approved unanimously by the Council, except for one member named Jose Joaquin Vargas.

That same year, on 3 October, he also terminated the Secretario Municipal (Municipal Clerk), Joaquin Calvo, reportedly based on non-factual gossip hearsay information. In addition to working under Meana, Calvo had worked under five other mayors (Serafín Donderis, Juan José Cartagena, Lucas Jiménez, José Mirelis, and Andrés Caparrós y García) as Secretario of the ayuntamiento, a position he had held since 1876. The third event was the scandal that came to the surface upon Meana firing Secretario Calvo. It was reported that Meana had a close friendship with the wife of a magistrate, Baron de Gracia Real, in whose house Meana lived. Upon the sudden death of Baron Gracia Real, Meana resigned his mayoral post, married the widow, and disappeared.

== Death ==
Meana died of malaria while in Rome.

== See also ==
- List of mayors of Ponce, Puerto Rico

Political offices
Preceded by Andrés Caparrós y García	Mayor of Ponce, Puerto Rico; 28 September 1882 - 31 May 1884	Succeeded by Rafael de Zárate y Sequera
