= Félix Saurí Vivas =

Mayor of Ponce, Puerto Rico in 1895

96th Mayor of Ponce, Puerto Rico
- In office 13 May 1895 – 11 July 1895
- Preceded by: Eduardo Armstrong
- Succeeded by: Juan José Potous

Personal details
- Born: December 1850 Mataró, Barcelona, Spain
- Died: 25 December 1915 (aged 65) Ponce, Puerto Rico
- Children: Rafael
- Occupation: businessman, hacienda holder
- Profession: politician

Félix Saurí Vivas (December 1850 – 25 December 1915), also known as Félix Saurí y Vivas, was a Spanish-Puerto Rican businessman and interim Mayor of Ponce, from 13 May 1895 to 11 July 1895.

== Career ==
Saurí Vivas was born in Mataró in the Province of Barcelona to Pedro Saurí and Teresa Vivas. He immigrated to Puerto Rico, where he was a businessman and hacienda holder. He became mayor of Ponce in 1895. In the same year, he also founded, with Juan Serralles Banco Crédito y Ahorro Ponceño, one of the leading banking institutions in Puerto Rico for almost a century.

== Casa Saurí ==
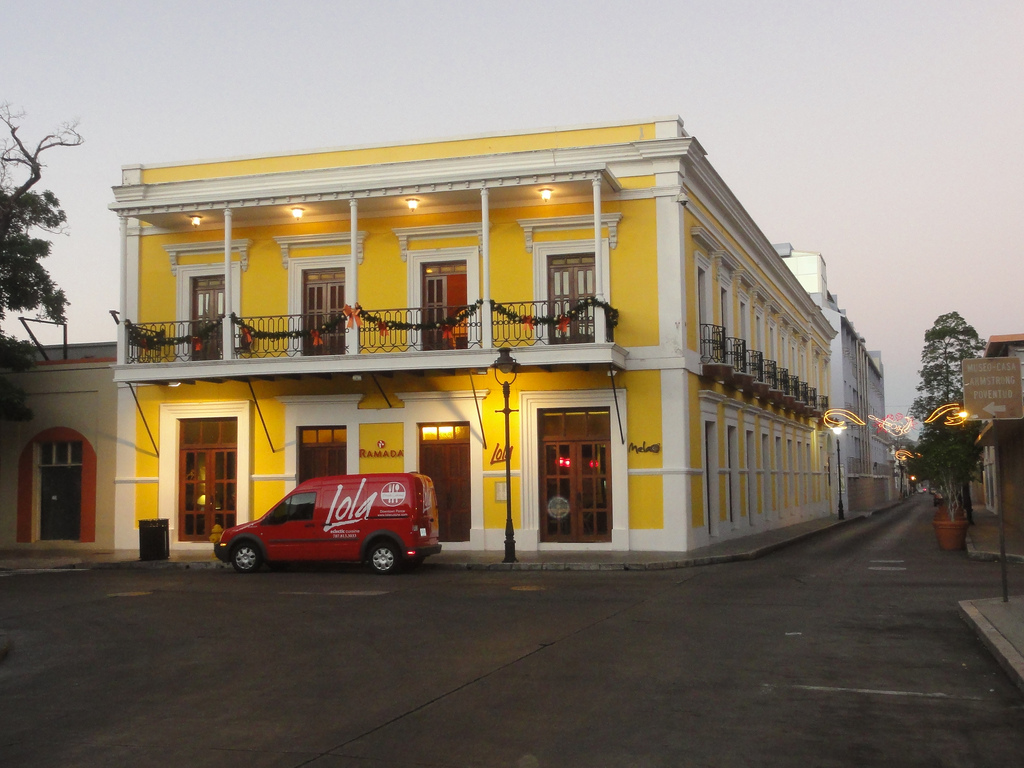
Historic Casa Sauri — located at Plaza Muñoz Rivera, within the Ponce Historic Zone, in Barrio Segundo, Ponce, Puerto Rico.

In 1882, Saurí Vivas built a two-story home, which later became known as Casa Saurí, in downtown Ponce, across from Plaza Muñoz Rivera, in today's Ponce Historic Zone. The house is said to be the third-oldest residence still standing in Ponce. It is located on the southwest corner of Calle Union and Calle Reina. In 1912, his home was used as the first site of Liceo Ponceño, Puerto Rico's first girls-only school.

After Liceo Ponceño vacated the home around the 1950s-1960s, the house was occupied for several years by various small businesses, including a travel agency and a toy store. Subsequently, it was vacant for several years. Then, in 2006-2009, the 1882 Casa Saurí was meticulously renovated and adapted as part of a new hotel, the Ponce Plaza Hotel & Casino, which opened in 2009. The hotel design included a four-story addition located next to the house, and a parking garage.

== Death ==
Félix Saurí Vivas died on 25 December 1915 at the age of 65. He was buried at Cementerio Católico San Vicente de Paul in Ponce.

== Legacy ==
In addition to leaving the majestic house in downtown Ponce as his legacy, mayor Félix Saurí Vivas is also honored at Ponce's Park of Illustrious Ponce Citizens.

== See also ==
- Ponce, Puerto Rico
- List of Puerto Ricans

Political offices
| Preceded by Eduardo Armstrong | Mayor of Ponce, Puerto Rico; 13 May 1895 – 11 July 1895 | Succeeded by Juan José Potous |
