= Carlos J. Garay Villamil =

Puerto Rican coachman

Carlos Juan Garay Villamil
- Born: 12 April 1881; Ponce, Puerto Rico
- Died: 20 September 1981 (aged 100); Ponce, Puerto Rico
- Occupation: Coachman
- Years active: 1908 - 1980
- Known for: Last and longest-serving coachman in Puerto Rico

Carlos Juan Garay Villamil (b. Ponce, Puerto Rico; 12 April 1881) was a long-serving coachman in Ponce, Puerto Rico, and Ponce's last one. Together with his horse-drawn carriage, he is considered an icon of the city of Ponce. He was "inmortalized" by the city and its municipal legislature by naming the Ponce public transportation terminal after him, Terminal de Transportación Pública Carlos Garay.

== Early years ==
Born in Ponce in 1881, Garay Villamil came from a family of coachmen; both his father as well as his grandfather were coachmen. Garay Villamil had very little formal education and was himself initiated as a coachman in 1908, when he was 27 years old. He then worked as a coachman for over 70 years.

== Occupation ==
During the turn of the nineteenth century and into the early twentieth century, the main means of transportation in Ponce was the horse-drawn carriage. However, with the arrival of the automobile in the first decade of the 20th century, the use of horse-drawn carriages slowly diminished and, eventually, their use was predominantly as a tourist attraction for seeing the Ponce downtown area. This was particularly true of the horse-drawn carriages driven by Garay Villamil, as he ran his horses into the 1960s and 1970s. At that time only one coachman was left, Gary Villamil himself. With the horse-drawn carriage industry eventually becoming entirely a tourist attraction, Garay Villamil received a small stipend from the Ponce municipal government to continue offering his horse-drawn carriage rides to tourists. Some of the personalities known to have ridden his carriages are Nemesio Canales, Luis Llorens Torres, Luis Muñoz Rivera, José de Diego, Antonio R. Barceló, Antonio Paoli and Miguel Pou.

== Death ==
Garay Villafil died in Ponce on 20 September 1981; he was 100 years old. He was buried at Cementerio Civil de Ponce. His funeral service and burial were transmitted via WPAB.

== Accolades ==
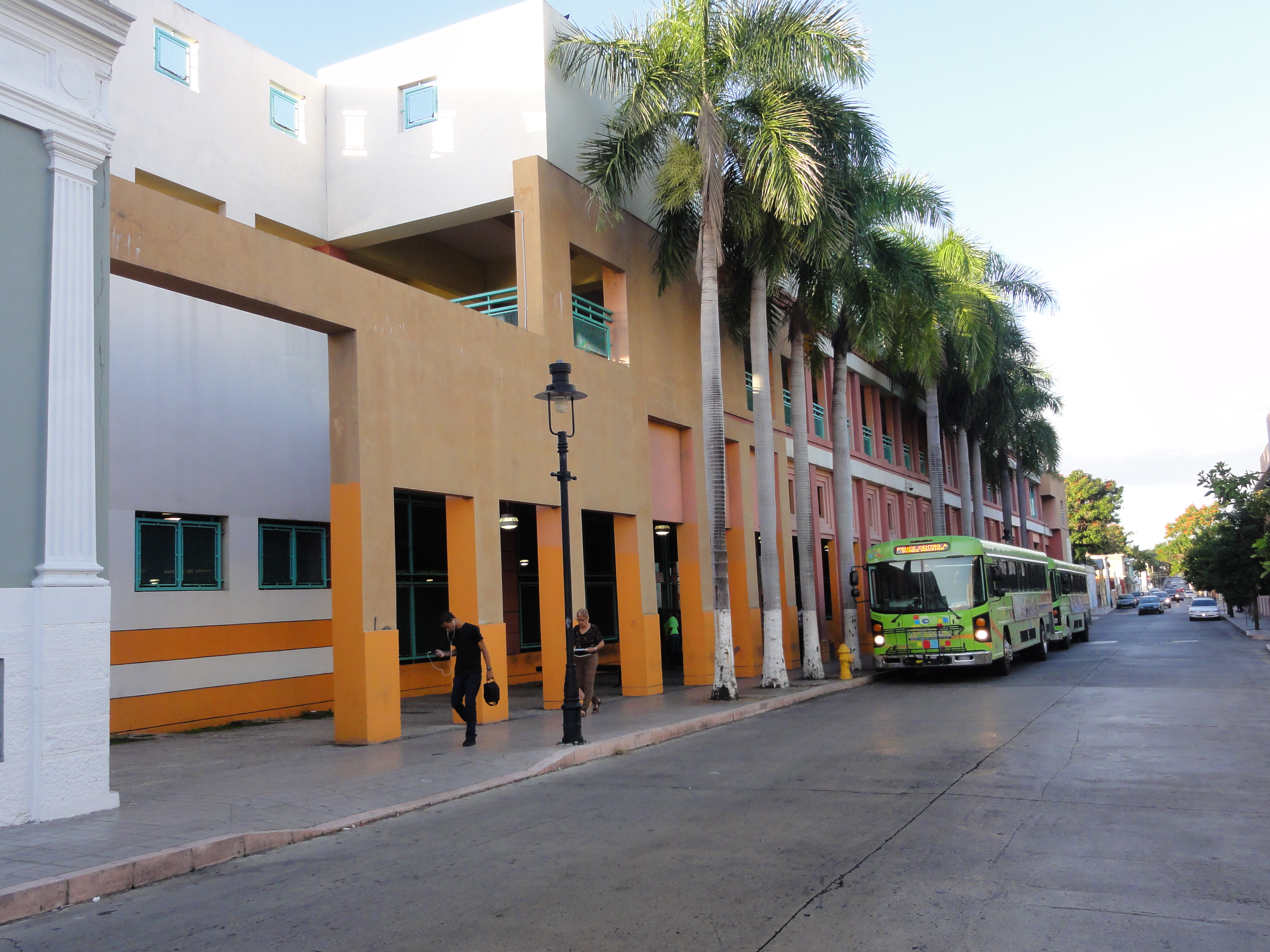
The Carlos J. Garay Villamil Public Transportation Depot in Ponce

In 1983, Ponce mayor José G. Tormos Vega honored long-time local legend Garay Villamil for his contributions to the traditions of the city of Ponce in his capacity as a horse-drawn carriage coachman. A plaque has since been added to the front facade of the Ponce City Hall to commemorate the event. The plaque is at the site that Garay Villamil used as his depot point for carrying tourists on horse-drawn rides through the city. In 1987, the municipality of Ponce named the city of Ponce's public transportation terminal after him: Terminal de Transportación Pública Carlos Garay.

== In popular culture ==
The salsa song by Héctor Lavoe, titled Ponce (Craft Recordings, a division of Concord Music Group, Inc., 1987), written by Tommy Sánchez, starts by saying "Hablare del Gran Garay, de su caballo y su coche..." (I will speak of the Great Garay, of his horse, and his carriage...).

== Legacy ==
Miguel Pou's 1926 painting Los coches de Ponce alludes to the industry of which Garay Villamil was its last bastion. The painting is housed at the Museo de Arte de Ponce.
