= Terminal de Transportación Pública Carlos Garay =

Public transportation terminal for shared ride passengers in Ponce, Puerto Rico

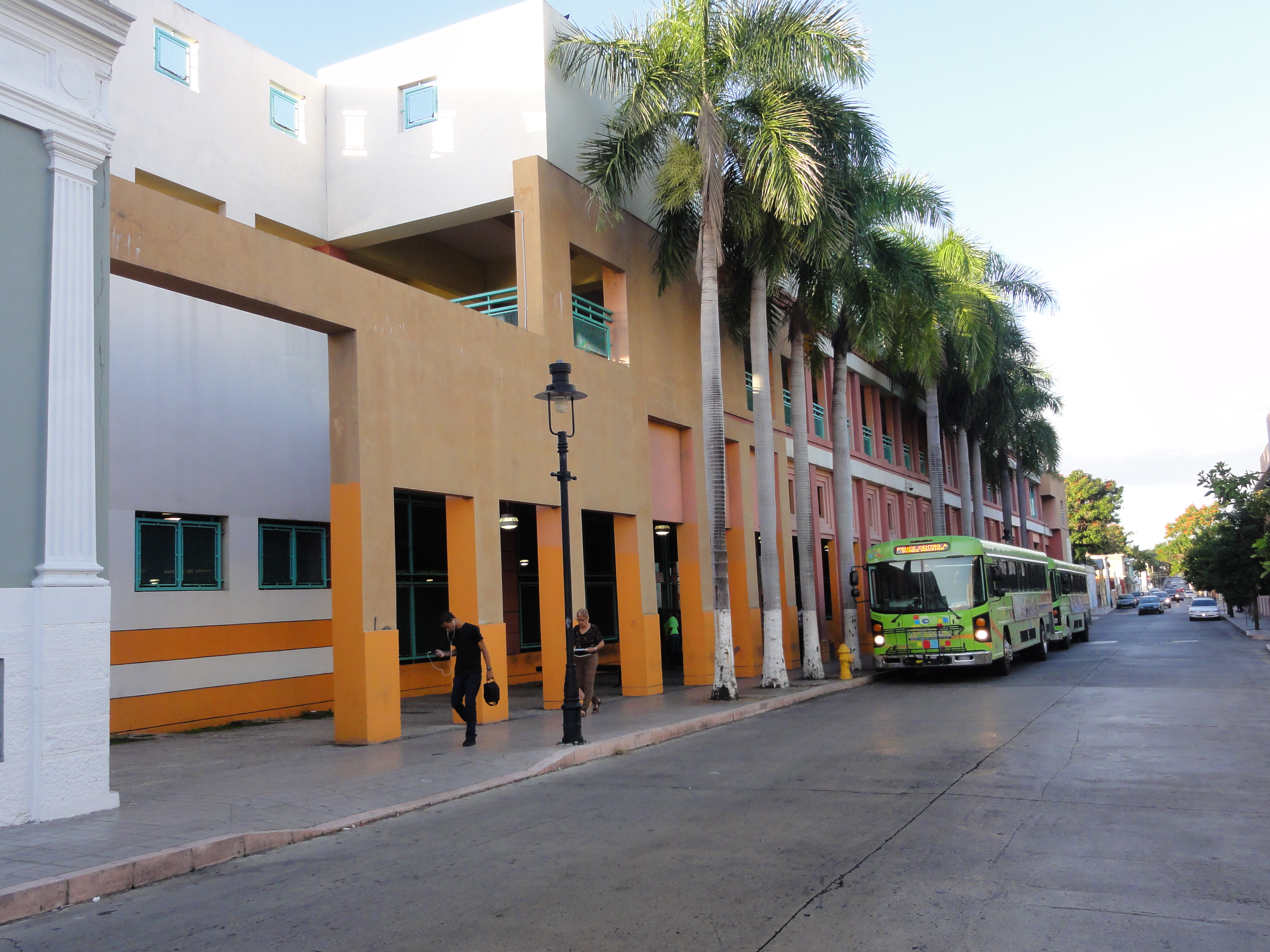
- Terminal de Carros Públicos Carlos Garay, Calle Victoria side, looking west (2014)

General information
- Location: The block bounded by Calle Vives, Union, Victoria and Mendez Vigo. Ponce, Puerto Rico
- Coordinates: 18.01426°N 66.61560°W
- Owner: Municipality of Ponce
- Operator: Municipality of Ponce
- Lines: Don Q, Choferes Unidos, others
- Platforms: 3 levels
- Bus operators: SITRAS

Construction
- Structure type: Steel and concrete
- Platform levels: 3
- Parking: 425
- Cycle facilities: 20

History
- Opened: 1987
- Rebuilt: 2004

Passengers
- 2017: 7,500
Location

Terminal de Transportación Pública Carlos Garay (Carlos Garay Public Transportation Terminal), formerly, Terminal de Carros Públicos Carlos Garay (Carlos Garay Carros Públicos Terminal), is a public transportation terminal for shared ride passengers and SITRAS bus system in Ponce, Puerto Rico. It is located on the block bounded by Calle Vives, Calle Unión, Calle Victoria and Calle Mendez Vigo, in the Ponce Historic Zone, two blocks northwest of the main city square, Plaza Las Delicias. It opened in 1987. On a typical weekday, approximately 500 passengers on about 40 buses and shared-ride vehicles use the station. The building is an example of 1960s urban renewal. When at its peak, the Carlos Garay terminal accommodates over 100 públicos.

== History ==
The first public transportation in the city consisted of horse-drawn wagons and was started in the 1850s. The first such service car was made operational on 24 June 1854 by Juan Nepomuceno Castro. Señor Castro had purchased the wagon for that purpose from Guillermo Neumann, who had been mayor of Ponce three years earlier, from 23 April 1851 to 30 September 1851. As "a large city with a small town flavor", for years Ponce's public mass transportation system consisted only of a shared taxi service providing public cars and vans known as públicos.

The first line of public transportation via automobile between Ponce and San Juan was established in 1902. By the 1940s, a network of públicos numbering some 20 "líneas" (lines, or shared taxi companies) had already emerged in Ponce, and positioned itself along various downtown city streets. The 20 or so líneas served both intra-city and inter-city transportation needs. Lineas providing inter-city service, that is, those heading to other towns such as San Juan, Mayaguez, Guayama, Peñuelas, Adjuntas, and Juana Diaz, were stationed around the perimeter of Plaza Las Delicias and numbered eight, with a fleet of 38 vehicles. Intra-city lines, namely those heading to various communities in the city of Ponce (Jardines del Caribe, Cantera, Glenview, etc.) or to its barrios, including Guaraguao, Anón, Coto Laurel, etc., projected further out from the city center, were located mostly in the area surrounding Plaza del Mercado de Ponce, and numbered 12 líneas, with a fleet of 109 vehicles. The entire shared taxi network covered some 8-10 city blocks of downtown Ponce. The scattered públicos generated congestion in some downtown streets, was plagued by unpredictable and sporadic service, had limited or no service at all on weekends, and no evening service. It was under these set of circumstances that the need to create a hub for Ponce's public transportation system became evident.

The plan to build the terminal took concrete form during the administration of mayor Tormos Vega (1977-1984). Fifteen properties (mostly residential homes) were purchased, at a cost of $2,000,000 ($10.6 million in 2025 dollars) in order to secure the land area necessary to building the terminal. Construction began in the later part of 1983 at a cost of $4,500,000 ($14.5 million in 2025 dollars). In its opening year (1987), the terminal was assigned an operating budget of $160,000 ($453,427 in 2025 dollars).

The decentralized shared ride system changed in 1987 when all the líneas scattered throughout downtown Ponce were centralized at the 3-story Terminal de Carros Públicos Carlos Garay upon the Terminal's inauguration. With the inauguration of the SITRAS city bus system 25 years later (2012), buses also started to use the terminal as their central depot.

== Architecture ==
The terminal has a footprint of 8,563 square meters and was made possible, in part, through funds from the Urban Mass Transportation Administration. The building is constructed of huge steel-reinforced concrete trusses. The structure has space for 425 vehicles. The site now occupied by this terminal was the site of the city's first cemetery in the 1700s, and Calle Union street was known as "La Calle del Cementerio" (Cemetery Street). In 1842, as the town grew and for health reasons (in times of heavy rains, cadavers would float up to the surface), a new cemetery was built much further away from the center of town, which is today (2018) known as Panteon Nacional Roman Baldorioty de Castro.

== Name ==
The terminal was named after Carlos J. Garay Villamil, a cochero from Ponce, who for decades provided tourists with horse-drawn rides around the city.

== Bus service ==
Local buses stop at the terminal but do not enter it, as the interior of the terminal was not designed for bus service. SITRAS buses stop on Calle Vives on the southern perimeter of the terminal.

== See also ==
- Mercedita Airport
- Port of Ponce
- PR-52
- International Association of Public Transport
