= Eduardo Armstrong =

Mayor of Ponce, Puerto Rico in 1898

95th Mayor of Ponce, Puerto Rico
- In office 10 August 1894 – 3 May 1895
- Preceded by: José de Nouvilas de Vilar
- Succeeded by: Félix Saurí Vivas

Personal details
- Born: 24 January 1851 Ponce, Puerto Rico
- Died: 19 June 1895 (aged 44) Ponce, Puerto Rico
- Party: Partido Liberal Reformista
- Relations: Thomas Armstrong Toro (brother)
- Profession: Politician

Eduardo Armstrong Toro (24 January 1851 – 19 June 1895) was Mayor of Ponce, Puerto Rico, from 1894 to 3 May 1895. He was the brother of Thomas Armstrong Toro, for whom a high school is named in Ponce, Puerto Rico.

== Early years ==
Armstrong Toro was born in Ponce, Puerto Rico, on 24 January 1851. His parents were Peter Luther Lothario Armstrong Creagh (1800–1863) and Antonia Toro Y Loudón (1825–1901), who married on 14 May 1840. He was the sixth of eight children born to Peter Luther and Antonia. His seven siblings were Tomás (1841–1907), Emilia (1843–1914), Jaime (1845 – ca. 1850), Carlos Walter (1847–1913), Ana (1849–1930), Guillermo (1853 – ca. 1855), and Carolina (1855–1890).

== Mayoral term ==
Armstrong Toro was mayor of Ponce from 10 August 1894 to 3 May 1895. He was a member of the Partido Liberal Reformista, and ran an efficient government, neither encountering nor generating any significant malfunctions. He was focused on maintaining the city clean and well cared for. Armstrong Toro is best remembered for ordering the elimination of houses in ruins throughout the city and the construction of new buildings in their place. He also advanced the cause of public education in the city.

== Death ==
Armstrong Toro died while in office on 19 June 1895 after a short illness. He was 44 years old. Félix Saurí, at the time Teniente de Alcalde gave notice of Armstrong's death and took over mayoral duties on an interim basis.

== See also ==
- List of Puerto Ricans
- List of mayors of Ponce, Puerto Rico

Political offices
Preceded by José de Nouvilas de Vilar	Mayor of Ponce, Puerto Rico; 10 August 1894 – 3 May 1895	Succeeded by Félix Saurí Vivas
