= SITRAS =

Mass transit system in the city of Ponce, Puerto Rico

Sistema Integrado de Transportación del Sur
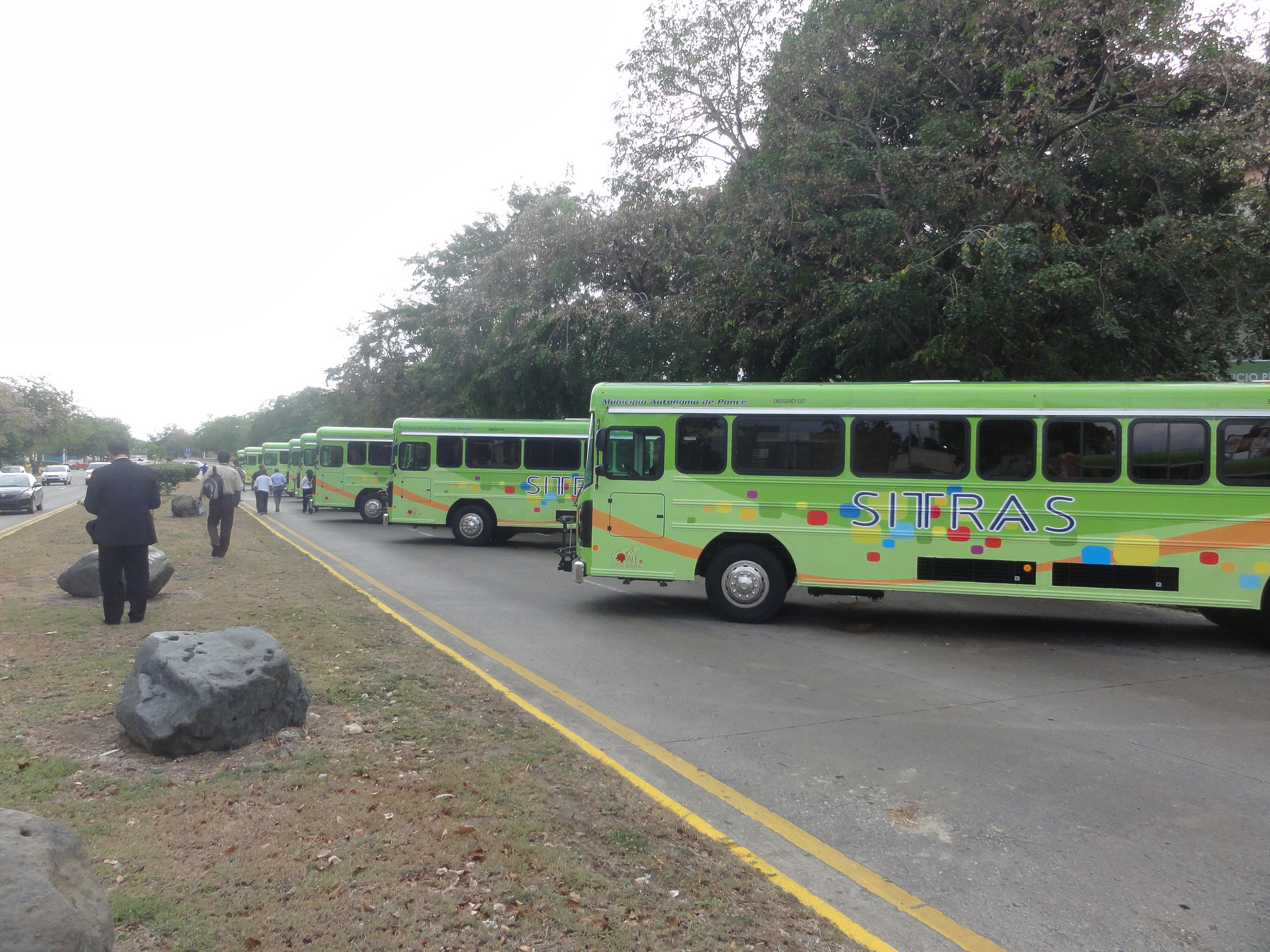
- Part of the SITRAS Fleet on display
- Founded: 14 February 2012
- Headquarters: Ponce, Puerto Rico
- Locale: Ponce, Puerto Rico
- Service area: Ponce Metropolitan Area
- Service type: Public Transit
- Alliance: Red de Porteadores SITRAS (22 independent Públicos)
- Routes: 3 (Feb 2012); 4 (Sept 2012); 8 (Feb 2023)
- Stops: 95 (Feb 2012); 95+ (Sept 2012); 300(Feb 2022)
- Destinations: 28 (Feb 2012); 28+ (Sept 2012)
- Hubs: 1 Centro de Informacion, Parque Dora Colón Clavell Ponce, PR
- Stations: 4 (Terminal Carlos Garay plus 3 outpost stations) [Feb 2012]; 5 [Sept 2012]
- Depots: 1 Terminal Carlos Garay, Ponce
- Fleet: 11 buses (Feb 2012); 22 independent publicos; 30 buses (Feb 2023)
- Daily ridership: 3,900
- Annual ridership: 50,000 (Feb 2012); 820,000 (Sept 2012); 240,000 (Feb 2022)
- Operator: Autonomous Municipality of Ponce
- Manager: Jessica Sinigaglia García (2012-2020); Jean Paul González Santini (2022-present)
- Website: https://sitrasponce.com/

SITRAS, officially, Sistema Integrado de TRAnsportación del Sur (Southern Integrated Transportation System), is the mass transit system in the city of Ponce, Puerto Rico. The service was inaugurated on 14 February 2012.

== History ==
As "a large city that feels like a small town", Ponce's public mass transportation system consisted only of a shared taxi service providing public cars and vans known as públicos.

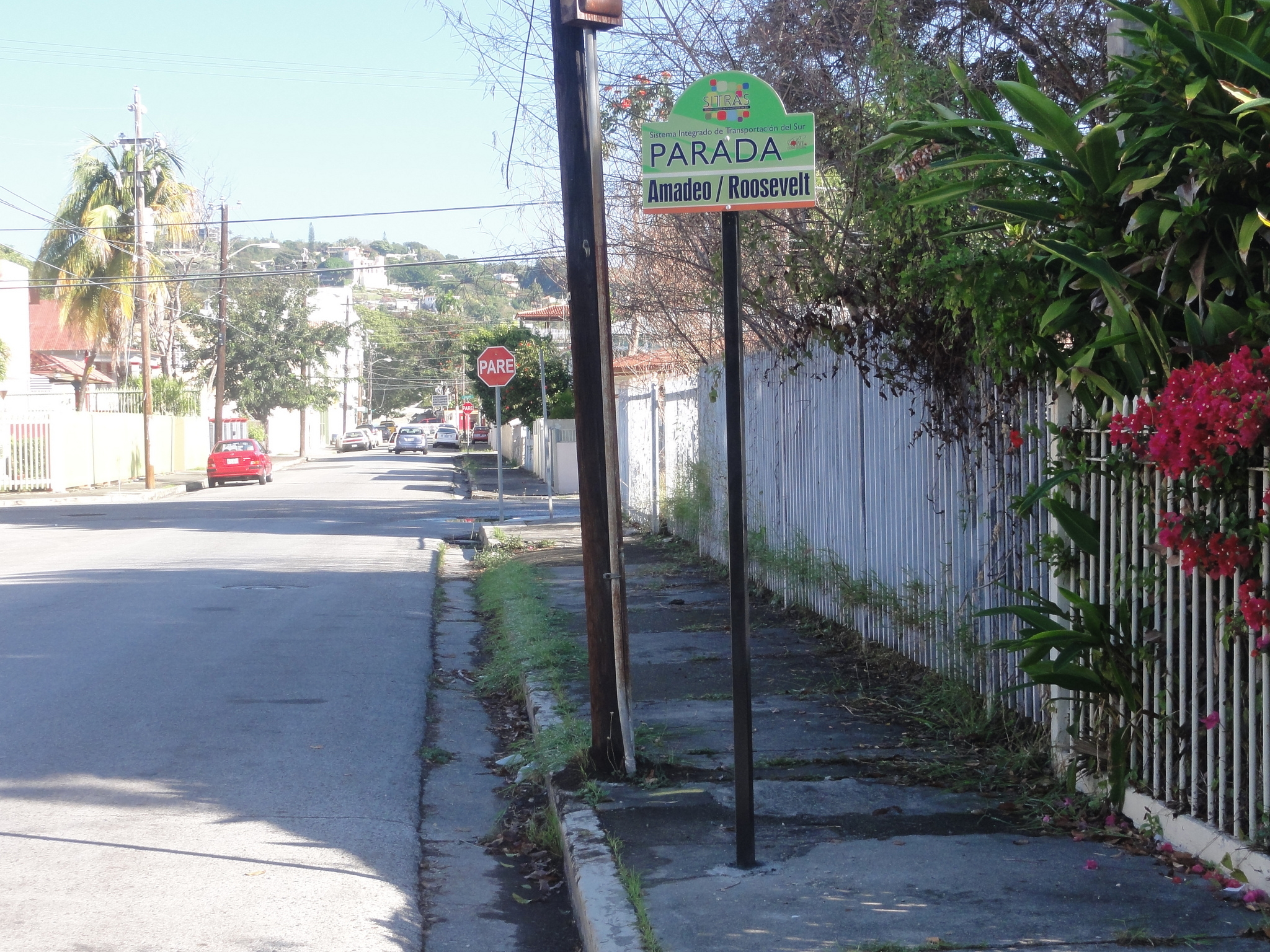
A SITRAS bus stop for the Orange Line

Since the 1940s, the network of públicos, numbering some 20 "lineas" (lines), had emerged and positioned itself along various downtown city streets. The 20 or so lineas served both intra-city and inter-city transportation needs. Lineas providing inter-city service, that is, those heading to other towns such as San Juan, Mayaguez, Guayama, Peñuelas, Adjuntas, and Juana Diaz, were stationed around the perimeter of Plaza Las Delicias and numbered eight, with a fleet of 38 vehicles. Intra-city lines, namely those heading to various communities in the city of Ponce (Jardines del Caribe, Cantera, Glenview, etc.) or to its barrios, including, Guaraguao, Anón, Coto Laurel, etc., projected further out from the city center, were located mostly in the area surrounding Plaza del Mercado de Ponce, and numbered 12 lineas, with a fleet of 109 vehicles.

The entire shared taxi network covered some 8-10 city blocks of downtown Ponce. This decentralized system changed in 1990 when all these líneas scattered throughout downtown Ponce were centralized at the 3-story high Terminal de Carros Públicos Carlos Garay upon the Terminal's inauguration. When at its peak, the Carlos Garay terminal accommodated over 100 públicos. Yet, while the 1990 públicos centralization at the Carlos Garay Terminal building relieved congestion in some downtown streets, it did little to provide relief from other públicos-related problems: the system continued to be plagued by unpredictable and sporadic service, limited or no service on weekends, no evening service, and similar weaknesses.

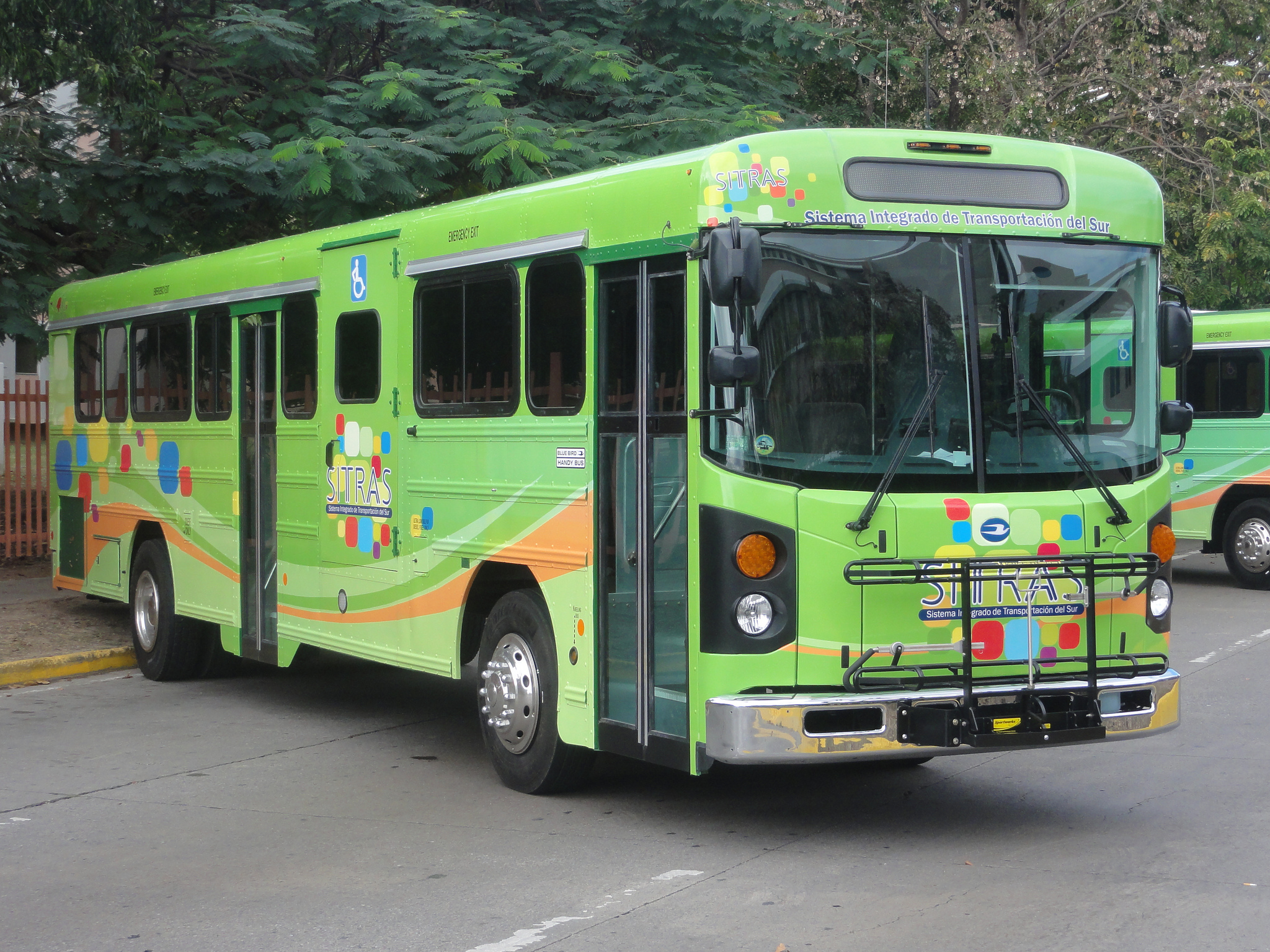
Closeup of a SITRAS bus

In 2008, the administration of mayor Maria Melendez, commissioned a study to seek a solution to these problems. After the necessary studies and permit phases were completed, the bus-based mass transit system known as SITRAS was launched. The new system cost $4 million to develop.

SITRAS was scheduled to start operating in November 2011, but various factors kept it from inaugurating then. After a 3-month delay the mass transit system was launched in February 2012 with 11 buses and three routes.

Unlike the shared taxi system, SITRAS provides predictable, scheduled service as well as weekend and evening service. However, the advent of SITRAS did not do away with the use of públicos altogether. Instead SITRAS was designed to complement the shared taxi service, with SITRAS taking over several city proper routes while públicos were expected to provide "connections" along the SITRAS routes to more remote and rural areas where SITRAS buses could not reach.

The Melendez administration envisioned Ponce's mass transit system to consist of three phases altogether, with future phases including a light rail system. Phase II of the project envisions adding route to La Playa, Coto Laurel, El Tuque and Calle Villa. According to a 30 June 2012 news report, a fourth SITRAS route was to be added to serve the El Tuque sector. The El Tuque route, scheduled to start service in September 2012, started on 12 September 2012.

== Fare and routes ==
There is no cost for riding in the system. As of July 2012, the system routes are as follows:

Route color	Route name	Bus letter ID(s)	Stops	Terminals	Communities Served
Green	Northwest	A, B, C	39	Ponce - Las Delicias	Las Delicias, Jardines del Caribe, Quebrada del Agua, Villa Paraíso, Quebrada Limón, Casa Mía, Río Canas, Marueño, Magueyes, El Madrigal and Nuevo Mameyes
Purple	North	D	19	Ponce - Ponce Housing	Ponce Housing, Barriada Borinquen, Cantera, Jaime L. Drew, Tibes, Río Chiquito and La Lula
Orange	Northeast	E, F, G	36	Ponce - Glenview	La Yuca, Glenview, Santa Teresita, La Rambla, Jardines de Fagot, Tormos Diego, El Paraíso, Vallas, Las Monjitas and Mariani
Yellow	Southwest	H(?)	20(?)	Ponce - El Tuque	Baldorioty, Ponce de León, Pedro Juan Rosaly, Canas, Río Canas, Bosque Señorial, Baramaya, Bello Horizonte, Las Margaritas, La Matilde, Punto Oro, Punta Diamante, Cooper View, Golden View, Silver View, La Cotorra, Las Batatas, Brisas del Caribe, and Nueva Vida - El Tuque

In 2016, a sixth route was added.

== Service notes ==
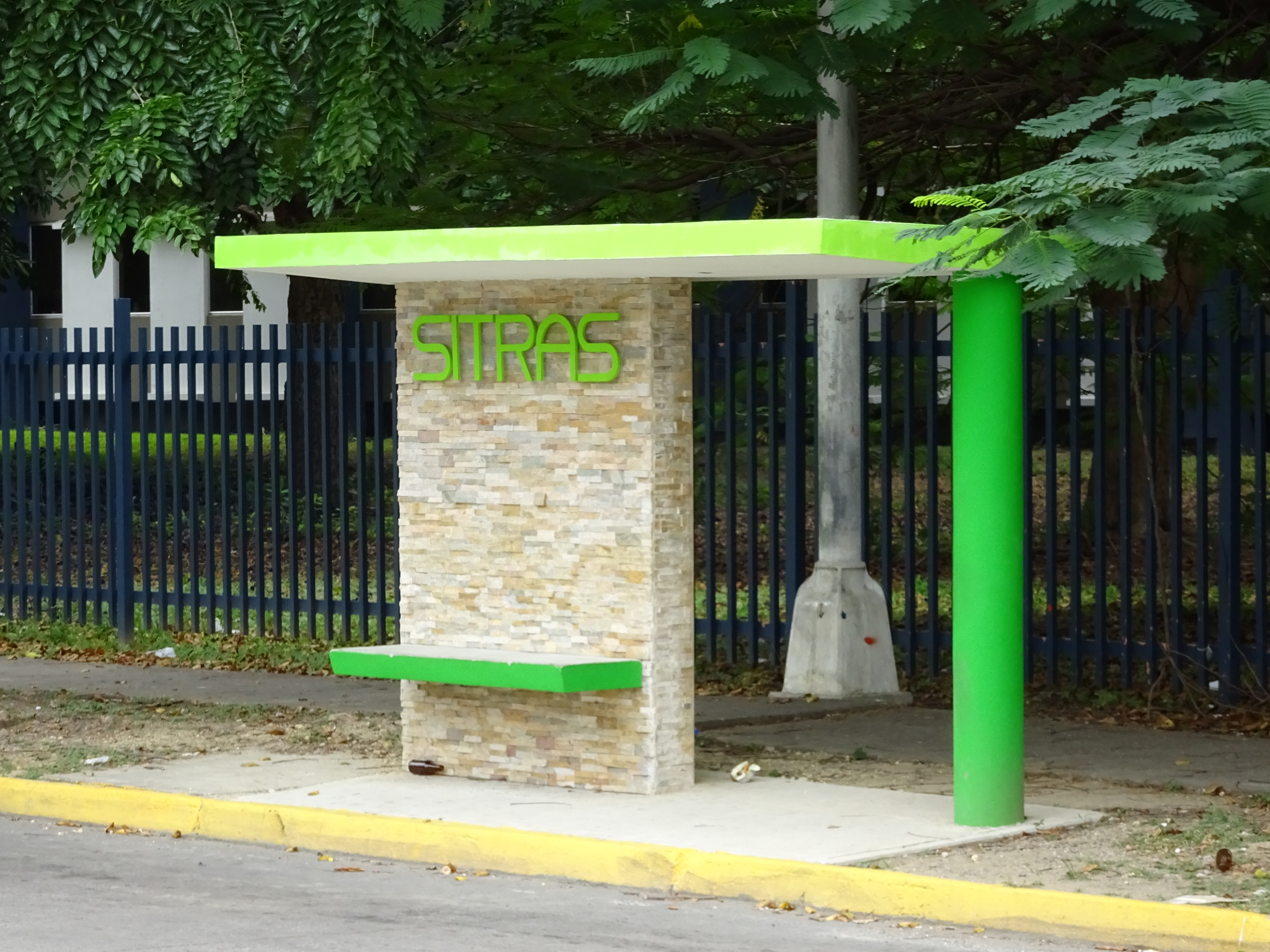
SITRAS bus stop on Avenida Las Américas

An informal early 2012 study by the local newspaper La Perla del Sur concluded that riders were satisfied with the SITRAS mass transit service. As with all public transportation services throughout the Island, SITRAS suspended operations on 20 September 2017 upon the passing of Hurricane Maria through Ponce. Operations were resumed on 1 October 2017.

== Fleet ==
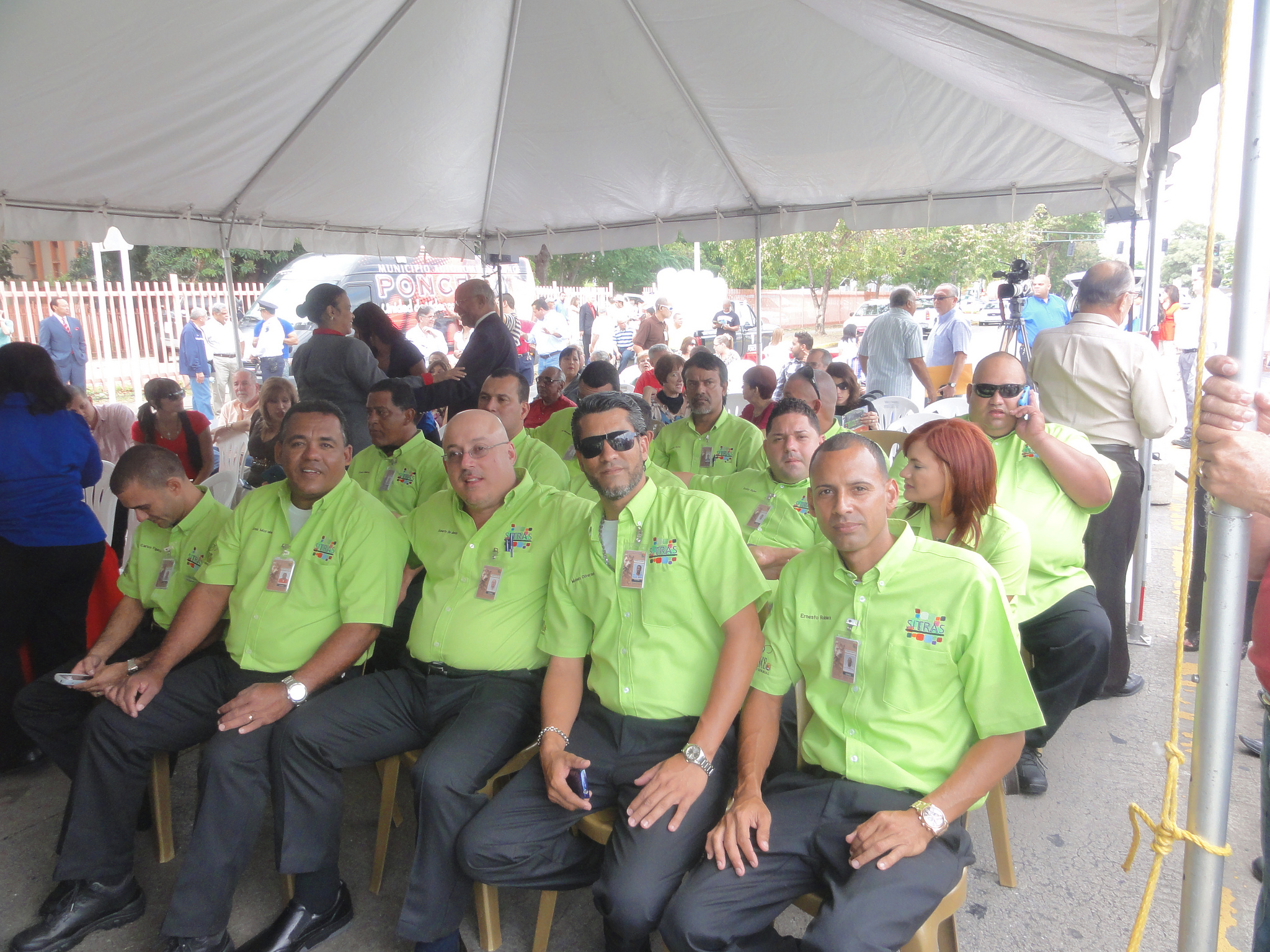
A group of SITRAS bus drivers getting ready to be commissioned

The system consists of 11 buses spread over 3 routes. Each bus can carry 34 people sitting - including 2 on wheelchairs - plus 12 more standing. The three routes are identified by a different color each: green, purple, orange. The project intends to run through two additional phases where residents of nearby towns may also be able to have bus stops in their towns to reach the city via mass transit. The buses are the year 2012 model of "Transit All American", and their make is Blue Bird, manufactured by Royal Motors Corporation. By September 2012, a request for another 11 buses, doubling the fleet, had already been placed by the municipal government to the Federal Transit Administration.

In October 2016, a tourism trolley was added and managed as part of the SITRAS system. It is based out of the Parque Urbano Dora Colón Clavell and makes 15 stops, including some of the city's most popular tourist destinations (Casa Alcaldía, Plaza del Mercado, Centro del Sur Mall, Parque Ecológico Urbano, Catedral de Nuestra Señora de Guadalupe and Liceo Ponceño). It will also stop at the Terminal de Carros Públicos Carlos Garay, where riders can transfer to one of the regular SITRAS buses.

== Management and budget ==
The SITRAS system is headed by Jessica Sinigaglia García. The system's annual operating budget is $2.8 million USD and the system has 50 employees.

== Gallery ==
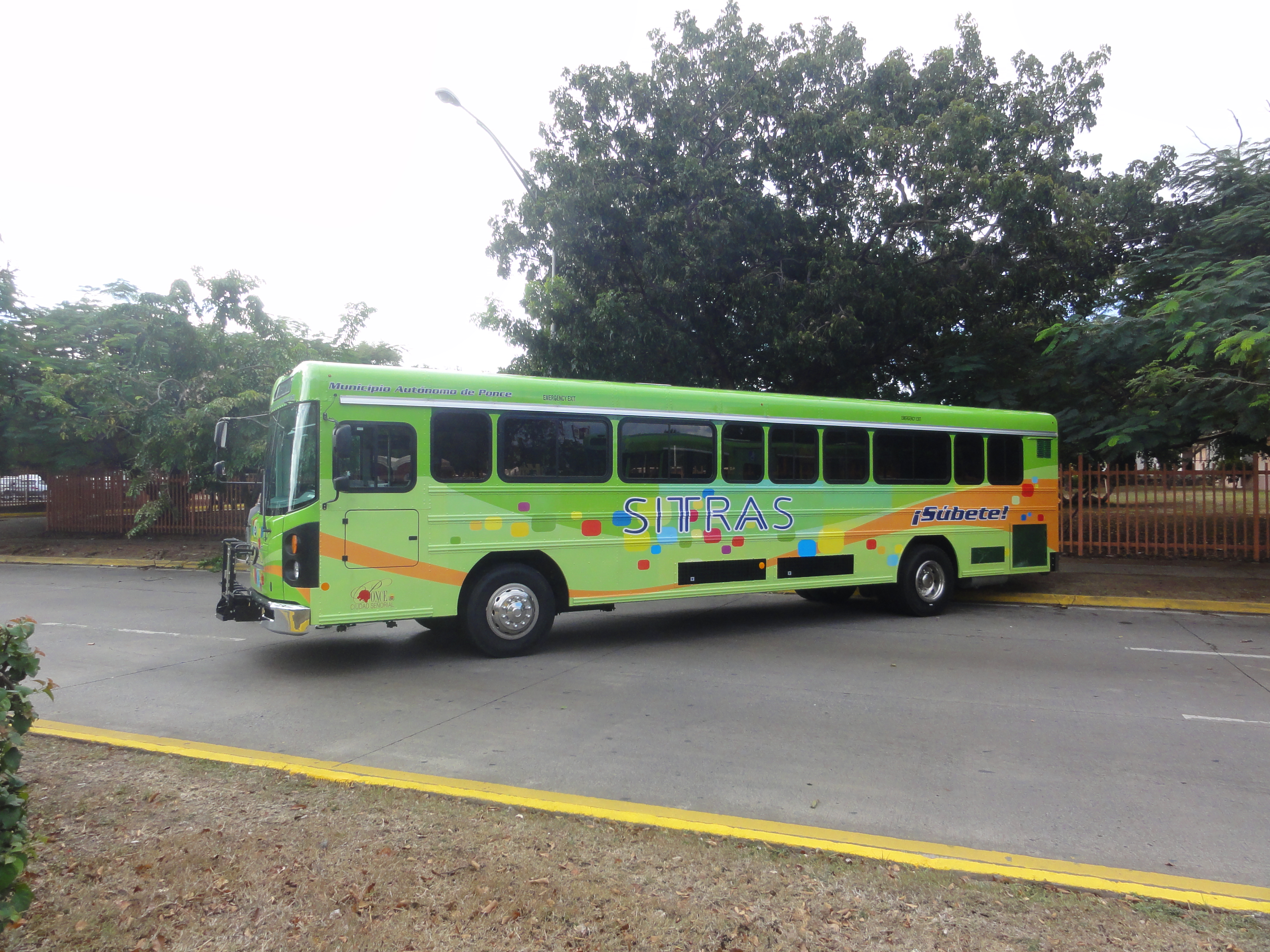

== See also ==
- Terminal de Transportación Pública Carlos Garay
- Transportation in Puerto Rico
