= Luis Gautier =

Mayor of Ponce, Puerto Rico

100th Mayor of Ponce, Puerto Rico
- In office 8 December 1897 – 20 June 1898 (Note: Socorro Girón states he was mayor until 9 December 1899 (see Ponce, el teatro La Perla y La Campana de La Almudaina, p. 400.), which appears to be a typographical error.)
- Preceded by: Miguel Rosich y Más
- Succeeded by: Ulpiano Colóm

Personal details
- Profession: Politician

Luis Gautier y Quesada (ca. 1850 – ca. 1920) was Mayor of Ponce, Puerto Rico, from 8 December 1897 to 20 June 1898. (Note: Socorro Girón states he was mayor until 9 December 1899 (See "Ponce, el teatro La Perla y La Campana de La Almudaina," p. 400.), which appears to be a typo because it would imply he was mayor before, during, and after the U.S. invasion of Puerto Rico, which was not the case.) He was the first of two mayors to lead the municipality of Ponce under the Spanish Crown's "Decreto Autonómico para Puerto Rico", whereby Puerto Rico was granted autonomy by Spain.

== Background ==
Gautier Quesada's participation in the Ponce political landscape had a long trajectory. He had been one of the signers of the 14 November 1886 Plan de Ponce. In 1887, he was one of 10 delegates from Ponce to the Island-wide political assembly held at Teatro La Perla, and which resulted in the founding of the Partido Autonomista Puertorriqueño. He had also been a long-time member of the Ponce Municipal Council, and immediately prior to becoming mayor, he also held the post of Teniente de Alcalde, the equivalent of a deputy mayor.

== Mayoral term ==
Puerto Rico had received from Spain a Charter of Autonomy on 25 November 1897, just 2 weeks before Gautier Quesada took office. Gautier Quesada became mayor of Ponce after the then-mayor of Ponce, Miguel Rosich y Más, resigned upon Puerto Rico receiving the Charter of Autonomy. Rosich Más resigned upon Puerto Rico receiving its Charter of Autonomy. As deputy mayor, Gautier Quesada automatically became mayor on an interim basis.

Gautier was the sitting mayor of Ponce when Spain declared war on the United States, and municipal government cash flow immediately became a concern. One direct result of the war was that the salaries of all municipal employees were slashed. Also, while the war carried on, Gautier Quesada also made sure there was enough of a supply of groceries and other basic necessities in the stores to help feed the residents of Ponce. Under the threat of an American incursion into Puerto Rico (Puerto Rico had been in a state of war since 27 March 1898), Gautier Quesada also dealt with the depletion of the existing reserves of coal for lighting the city streets. As the municipality had a business contract with the owners of the gasometro, the municipality moved to appropriate the holdings of the gasometro when the company failed to keep the terms of the contract, which included the Company would keep 200 tons of coal in reserves - but it had none. So the municipal government took over the company and provided the city lighting during the breakdown—albeit petroleum, not coal—was used. He was mayor until 20 June 1898, when Ulpiano Colom took over as mayor. (Note: Socorro Girón states he was mayor until 9 December 1899. See "Ponce, el teatro La Perla y La Campana de La Almudaina," p.400.)

== See also ==
- List of mayors of Ponce, Puerto Rico
- List of Puerto Ricans

== Notes ==
Political offices
Preceded by Miguel Rosich y Más	Mayor of Ponce, Puerto Rico; 8 December 1897 - 20 June 1898	Succeeded by Ulpiano Colóm
