= Ermelindo Salazar =

Mayor of Ponce, Puerto Rico

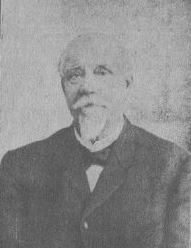
- Ermelindo Salazar

88th Mayor of Ponce, Puerto Rico
- In office May 1887 – 10 July 1887
- Preceded by: Ramón Elices Montes
- Succeeded by: Fernando Diez de Ulzurrún y Somellera

Personal details
- Born: ca. 1830 Ponce, Puerto Rico
- Died: ca. 1910
- Spouse(s): (1) Leonora Fajardo (2) Juana Palau
- Children: Andres, Adela, Guillermo Francisco (1880-1950)
- Occupation: Co-ownwer of Ermelindo & Pedro Salazar & Co.
- Profession: Landowner, Merchant, Banker

Ermelindo Salazar Schuck (c. 1830 – c. 1910) was the interim Mayor of Ponce, Puerto Rico, from May to 10 July 1887. He filled the mayoral post between the resignation of mayor Ramón Elices Montes and the arrival of Fernando Diez de Ulzurrún y Somellera, who was appointed mayor by the Central Provincial Government.

Salazar Schuck was a merchant, landowner and banker, and is best remembered for his majestic residence in Downtown Ponce (70 Cristina Street) and which today is home to the Carmen Solá de Pereira Ponce Cultural Center. From 1959 to 1965, the building was the first home of the Museo de Arte de Ponce and from 1991 to 1996 it was the first headquarters of the Museo de la Música Puertorriqueña.

== Early years ==
Ermelindo Salazar Schuck was born in Ponce, Puerto Rico, to Pedro Juan Salazar Fournier and Luisa Schuck.

== Landowner, merchant and banker ==
Salazar Schuck was a prominent landowner, merchant, and banker from Ponce. In his life as a merchant, in 1885, he founded the Ponce Chamber of Commerce. In the area of finance, Salazar became one of the directors, and later president, of Banco Crédito y Ahorro Ponceño, one of the largest and oldest in the Island.

== Family life ==
Salazar Schuck married Leonora Fajardo, a wealthy woman also from Ponce. One of Ermelindo's sons, Guillermo Salazar, built his own majestic house also in the Ponce Historic Zone. This house was converted into the Museo de la Historia de Ponce in 1992.

== Political and civic life ==
On 27 April 1884, he was elected as a delegate to the Cadiz Cortes. On 28 November 1917, Salazar Schuck was appointed to the Board of Directors of the Port of Ponce. For two months (May to 10 July 1887), he filled the mayoral post between the resignation of mayor Ramón Elices Montes and the arrival of Fernando Diez de Ulzurrún y Somellera, who was appointed mayor by the Central Provincial Government.

== Legacy ==
Salazar is honored at the Ponce Tricentennial Park for his contributions to the municipality of Ponce.

== See also ==
- List of mayors of Ponce, Puerto Rico
- List of Puerto Ricans

Political offices
Preceded by Ramón Elices Montes	Mayor of Ponce, Puerto Rico; May 1887 - 10 July 1887	Succeeded by Fernando Diez de Ulzurrún y Somellera
