= José Lloréns Echevarría =

Mayor of Ponce, Puerto Rico

102nd Mayor of Ponce, Puerto Rico
- In office 8 November 1898 – 10 November 1898
- Preceded by: Ulpiano Colóm
- Succeeded by: Luis Porrata Doria

Personal details
- Born: 1843
- Died: 8 July 1920 (aged 76–77) Ponce, Puerto Rico
- Profession: Journalist

José Lloréns Echevarría (1843 – 8 July 1920) was Mayor of Ponce, Puerto Rico, for three days, from 8 November 1898 to 10 November 1898.

== Early years ==
Lloréns Echevarría was the son of José Lloréns Robles and Severiana Echevarría Quintero. He was director of the paper El Autonomista.

== Mayoral term ==
Due to the American Government centralizing the insular government in San Juan after the invasion of the Island, the American military governor of Puerto Rico at the time, Major General Guy Vernon Henry, (Note: Felix Pubill (La Administración Municipal de Ponce, p. 95) states José Lloréns Echevarría's removal as mayor was done by American governor "Mr. [John R.] Brooke") not trusting his loyalty to the new American government in Puerto Rico, removed Lloréns Echevarría as mayor of Ponce and installed Luis Porrata Doria on 11 November 1898.

Upon the governor's pronunciation a large number of Municipal Council members resigned their posts: José Lloréns Echevarría himself, Ulpiano Colom, Pedro J. Rosaly, Lucas P. Valdivieso, Antonio Morales, Baudilio Rabbaine, don Perez, Pedro J. Fournier, Antonio Arias, Emilio Cortada, Eugenio Morales, Fernando Vendrell, Carlos Felix Chardón, Alejandro Albizu, Deodoro Rivas, Antonio Mayoral, and Ramon E. Gadea, disapproving of the new mayor, all resigned their posts. In response, the governor named Luis Porrata Doria, Manuel Zaldo, Francisco Becerra, Jose Vidal Vilaret, Julio Bernard, Julio Rivera, Elias Concepcion, Jose Pou Carreras, Jose Usera, Jose Ramon Gonzalez, Rodulfo del Valle, Adolfo Cabrera, Miguel Hernandez, Herminio Armstrong, Santiago Fores, Pedro Auffant, Antonio Perez Guerra, Agustin Arce, Francisco Ruiz Porras.

== Later years and death ==
After leaving his post as mayor, he worked as Municipal Council clerk during the mayoral administrations of Albert Myer, Pedro Juan Rosaly, Jose de Guzman Benitez, Enrique Chevalier, and Manuel V. Domenech, that is, from 1899 to 1904. In 1902, he was one of eight directors of El Águila de Puerto Rico, a newspaper in Ponce. Lloréns Echevarría died on 8 July 1920 and was interred at Cementerio Civil de Ponce.

== See also ==
- List of mayors of Ponce, Puerto Rico
- List of Puerto Ricans

== Notes ==
Political offices
Preceded by Ulpiano Colóm	Mayor of Ponce, Puerto Rico; 8 November 1898 - 10 November 1898	Succeeded by Luis Porrata Doria
