= Residencia Armstrong-Poventud =

Historic building in Ponce, Puerto Rico

- Armstrong-Toro House
- U.S. National Register of Historic Places
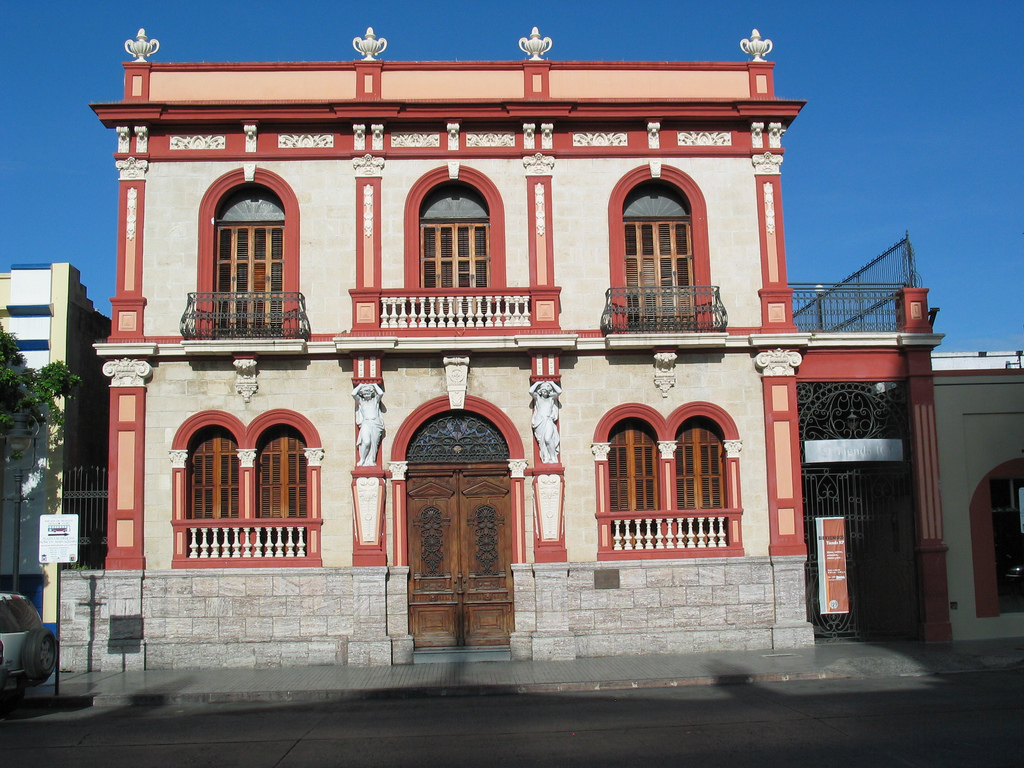
- Residencia Armstrong-Poventud in August 2010

- Location within Puerto Rico
- Location: 9 Calle Unión, Ponce, Puerto Rico
- Coordinates: 18°00′42″N 66°36′53″W
- Area: less than one acre
- Built: 1899
- Architect: Manuel V. Domenech
- Architectural style: Neoclassical
- NRHP reference No.: 87001821
- Added to NRHP: 29 October 1987

Residencia Armstrong-Poventud (Armstrong-Poventud Residence) is a historic building located in the Ponce Historic Zone in Ponce, Puerto Rico, across from the Catedral Nuestra Señora de Guadalupe. The construction of this home set the stage for the construction of other homes of similar architectural elements, character and opulence in turn-of-the-twentieth-century Ponce. The architectural style is collectively known as Ponce Creole. The home was designed and built by Manuel Víctor Domenech for the Armstrong-Poventud family. It is listed on the U.S. National Register of Historic Places as the Armstrong-Toro House, and is also known as the Casa de las Cariatides. In 1991, the Instituto de Cultura Puertorriqueña turned the house into a museum, which it manages.

== Construction date ==
The Institute of Puerto Rican Culture (ICP) and the Puerto Rico Office of Historical Preservation have determined that the house was built in 1899. The American Architect and Building News magazine, on the front cover of its 25 January 1899, issue published the design of the Residencia Armstrong-Poventud. The Residencia was inaugurated fully as a museum by the ICP in October 2008. Prior to 2008, and starting in 1991, visitors were allowed to tour the house while it concurrently served as the Southern headquarters of the institute. The institute operates a small but diverse store in a wing of the museum.

== Significance ==
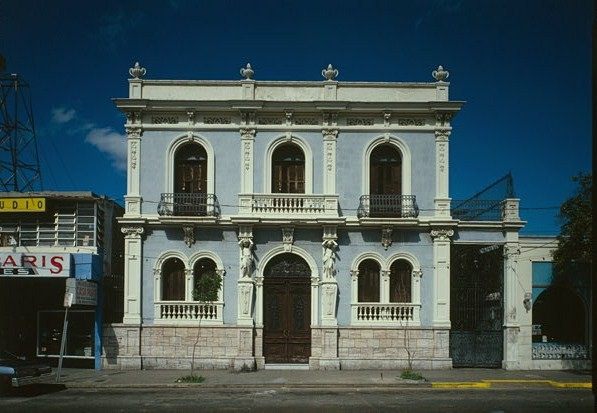
The Armstrong-Poventud Residence in 1977.

The Carlos Armstrong-Toro Residence is one of Ponce's most famous houses. This structure was designed and built by Manuel Domenech, one of the island's most distinguished architects of the late 19th and early 20th centuries. Some of Domenech's designs include: the Asilo De Pobres de Mayaguez and the Residencia Batiz. Domenech, a public figure in Puerto Rico during the 20th century, built many noteworthy private residences and public buildings in San Juan, Ponce, and Mayaguez.

Mr. Armstrong-Toro was one of Ponce's most distinguished citizens as well. His father, Pedro Lothario Armstrong y Creagh, was a Ponce merchant from St. Croix in the Danish West Indies. At the time a great deal of Puerto Rico's imports came through Danish St. Thomas. Armstrong-Toro was one of the first bankers in Puerto Rico, founder of the Banco de Ponce and the Banco Crédito y Ahorro Ponceño. Mr. Armstrong-Toro developed an international banking network with offices in Puerto Rico, Cuba, the United States, and Denmark. As a result of his extensive financial relations with the Danish government, Mr. Armstrong was conferred the high honor of the "Order of the Dannebrog" of Denmark and was named Danish Consul to Puerto Rico.

Residencia Armstrong-Poventud
- Established: 1991
- Location: Calle Union No. 9, western side of the street, facing the Ponce Cathedral, Ponce, Puerto Rico
- Type: Museum
- Owners: ICP, Commonwealth of Puerto Rico, San Juan, Puerto Rico

The Armstrong-Toro Residence is significant in the history of the architecture of Ponce because it is one of Domenech's most distinguished eclectic designs and among the best known. Its unique caryatid-framed main entrance, intricate ornamental details, and prominent location across from the Cathedral and public plaza have made this house a true architectural landmark in the city's traditional urban core. As a result, many houses were built during the early 20th century with similar elements in a similar vocabulary, contributing to the unique historic district of Ponce.

== Physical appearance ==
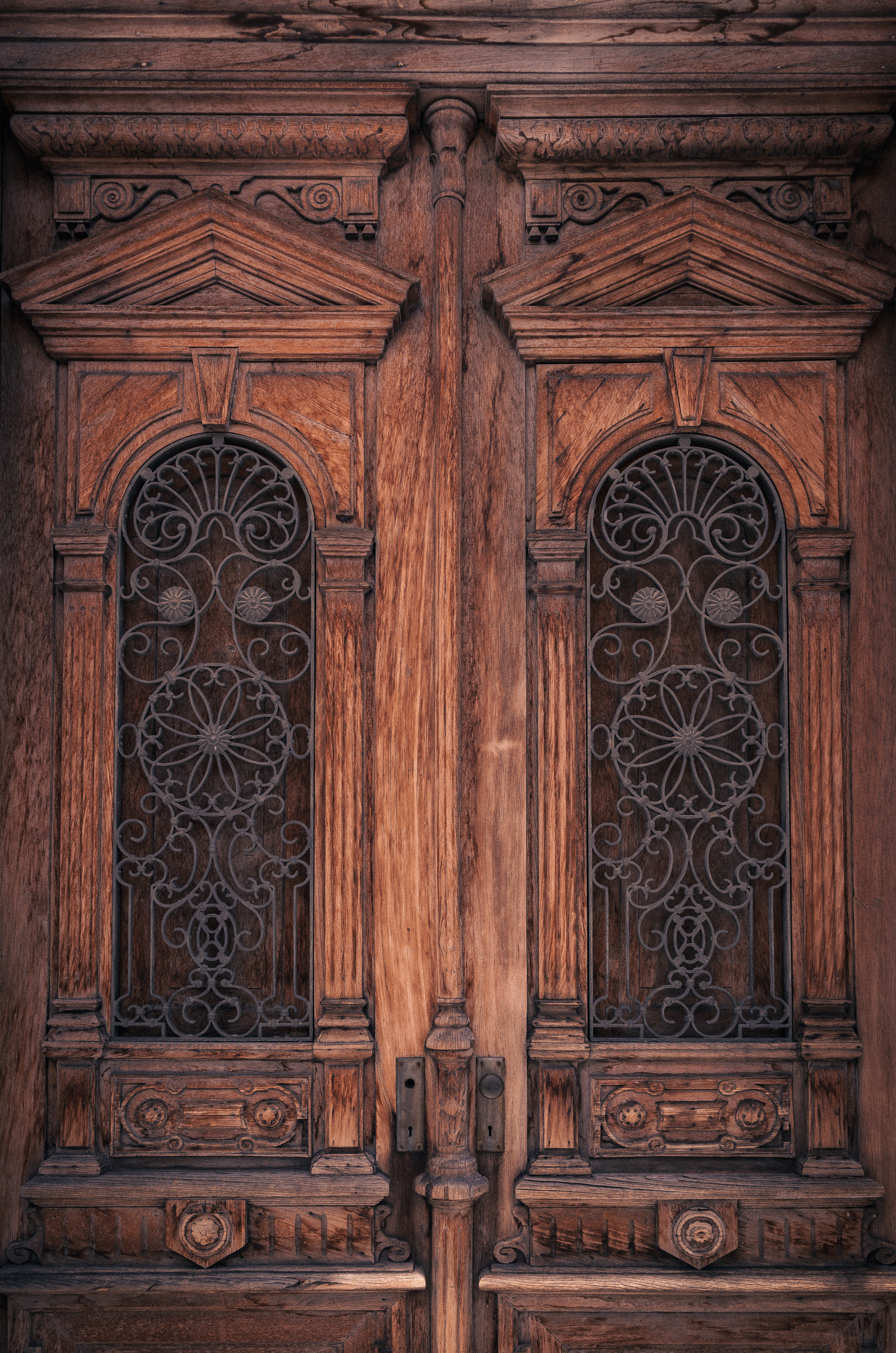
Front doors detail

Residencia Armstrong-Poventud is a two-story masonry building on the westside of Calle Union (No. 9), directly in front of the Cathedral and Plaza of the historic urban center of Ponce. The almost-cubic proportions of the facade are articulated in three bays: 2 wider bays flanking a central, narrower entrance bay.

At the ground level, a pink-stone plinth serves as a podium for the one story eclectic pilasters at the north and south extremes of the facade and for the two caryatids, which flank the main entrance and define the three bays of the facade. The central entrance arch cuts the podium and houses intricately carved hardwood doors and a stained-glass fanlight protected by decorative wrought iron railings. Bays 1 and 3 both consist of paired arches, located above the podium and articulated in an ionic pilaster order. Each arch-window houses folding jalousie shutters.

At the upper level there are four Ionic pilasters with pedestals resting on a continuous horizontal string-course. The three openings are symmetrically arranged and equally proportioned and articulated: a simple surround with a keystone frames a wide arch, opening out to a balcony through wooden jalousie doors. Decoratively etched clear glass lights occupy the tympanum over each opening. The first and third bay balconies contain waist-high decorative cast-iron railings and the wider central balcony consists of stone balusters and rails supported by the caryatid figures of the ground floor. A full-entablature cornice and solid parapet cap the facade composition. Roman-style amphorae on the parapet, above each pilaster, serve as finials for each bay division.

At the northern end of the structure, a concrete port-cochere enclosed by decorative wrought-iron railings projects from the upper-level floor line, creating a side terrace for the upper floor.

The house is very simple in plan and elegant in execution. The main entrance accesses a foyer with steps leading up to the major circulation hall through wooden and stained-glass double-doors. A sweeping stairway, toward the back of the house on the left side of the hall accesses the second floor, which is similar in plan to the first. All floors within the house are parquet and ceilings are of hand-painted decorative pressed metal. The floors were installed during the last restoration and the pressed-metal ceilings are all original.

As a result of the disastrous earthquake of 1918, the structure's northern wall had fallen and was subsequently reconstructed according to the original plans. The concrete-vaulted port-cochere was added at that time. Aside from this latter addition, the Armstrong-Toro house maintains the exact architecture of the original design.

=== Architecture ===
The Museum at Casa Armstrong Poventud presents the latest architectural and artistic taste in vogue at the end of the 19th century in Europe. For example, heavy use of glass on doors and windows. The glass decor used in the front door of the residence, for instance, is almost identical to those used in the Crystal Palace at the Great Exhibition of the Works of Industry of all Nations in England years earlier. The floral and natural motifs in the residence, are also characteristic of those comprising the new artistic expression of the Victorian Era evident in Europe and the United States in the first decades of the 20th century.

==== Front door entrance ====
The front door is an example of doors characteristic of the Victorian era. It achieved two purposes: decorative, but also to allow the passage of natural daylight. Almost all the doors in this Museum have unique characteristics not found in doors in the capital city of San Juan, where doors are considerably simpler. The residence displays a harmonious appreciation for the style, as much by the architects as by the owners of the Belle Époque.

==== Cariatides ====
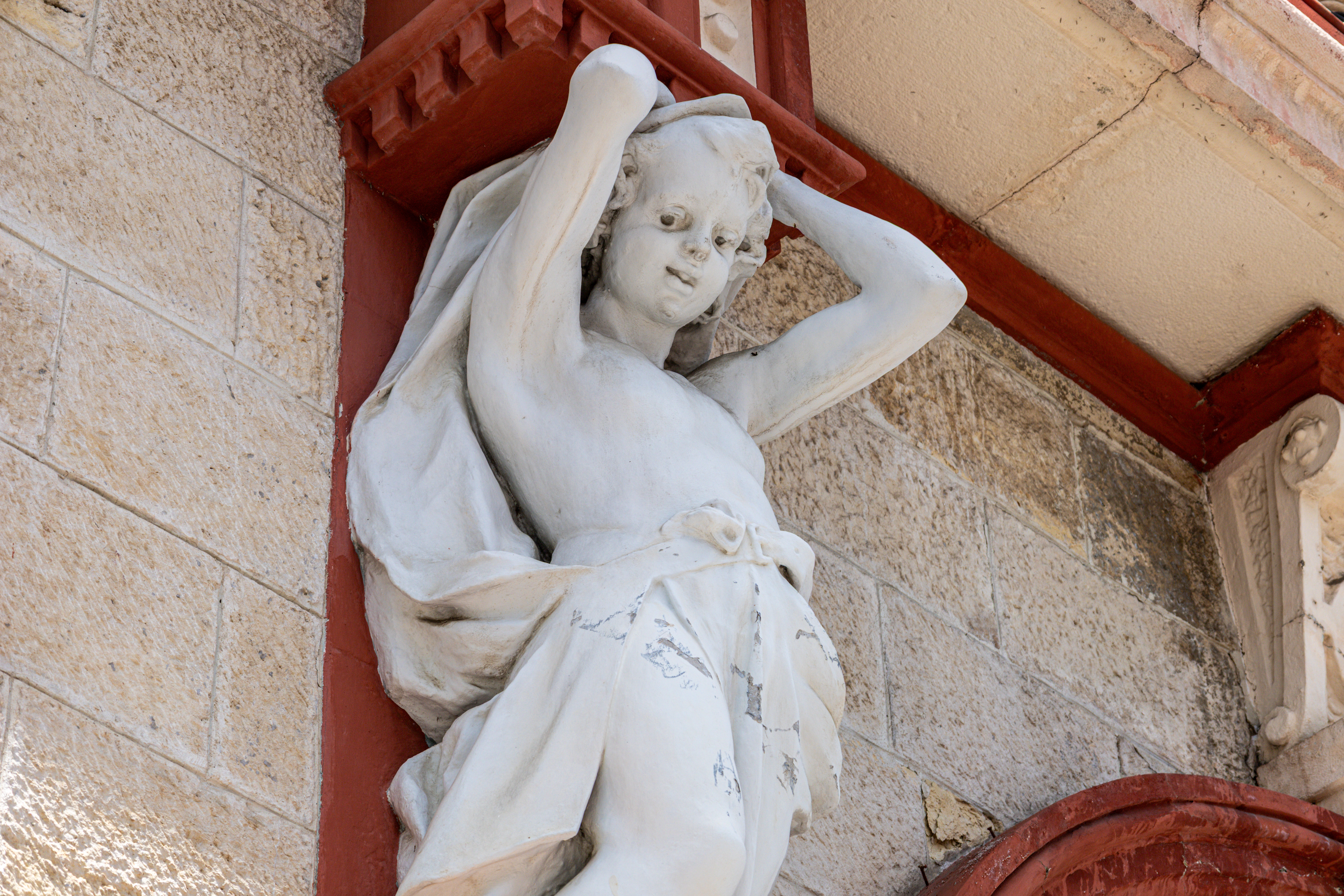
One of the caryatids

The cariátides (caryatids) statues used by architect Manuel V. Domenech for the front of the house were not the classical ones, but modernized adaptations of the classical ones. They do not display the solemn expression of the traditional ones, but smiling young people with a modern hairdo and displaying body motion. Even the pedestal on which the status lay has an Art-Nouveau style.

==== Interior details ====
The interior furniture and other items are also Victorian. The Residence emphasizes a multiplicity of styles in its interior, not just different epochs, but also different countries: Chinese jar, Victorian lamps, Art-Nouveau, and Austrian glass chandeliers.

==== Electrical and plumbing design ====
Mr. Manuel Victor Domenech used a variety of architectural elements from various epochs in a unique creative manner. He used, for example the most advanced objects of residential utility of the time such as electricity, bathroom and kitchens that functioned with an automatic plumbing system, to create a structure characteristics of the end of the Victorian era, known as Modernism. There is heavy use of electric light bulb lamps at a time when over 90% of the population of Puerto Rico used no electricity or plumbing.

=== Interiors description ===
Almost all the furniture and utensils from that era are still in place, as well as paintings and pictures belonging the original owners of this old home located directly in front of Our Lady of Guadalupe Cathedral, in the town square. The house is easy to spot thanks to the two caryatids in the front of the house and its overall neoclassic architectural style. With its gorgeous, neoclassical facade, the Casa Armstrong-Poventud is generally thought to be one of the most stately and elegant houses in Ponce. Built in 1900 as the home for this Scottish banker, the house served as the regional office of the ICP for 15 years. Casa Armstrong-Poventud building is an example of the neoclassical architectural heritage of the island. The Residence was listed in the National Register of Historic Places on 29 October 1987.

== Overall ==
The overall impression of the residence is one displaying a new appearance of modernism. It has both Victorian and modernistic elements in it, approaching details seen in Belgium, New York City, Chicago, and London at the time. The resulting style is one of modernistic Victorian architecture.

== Acquisition and restoration ==
The Institute of Puerto Rican Culture (ICP) acquired the building from the descendants of the original owners. Some of the original furniture and personal items of the home were included in the acquisition, as the Armstrong family lived the house uninterrupted for eight decades. The ICP restored the building on two occasions: in the 1980s and then again from 2006 to 2008.

== Historical background ==
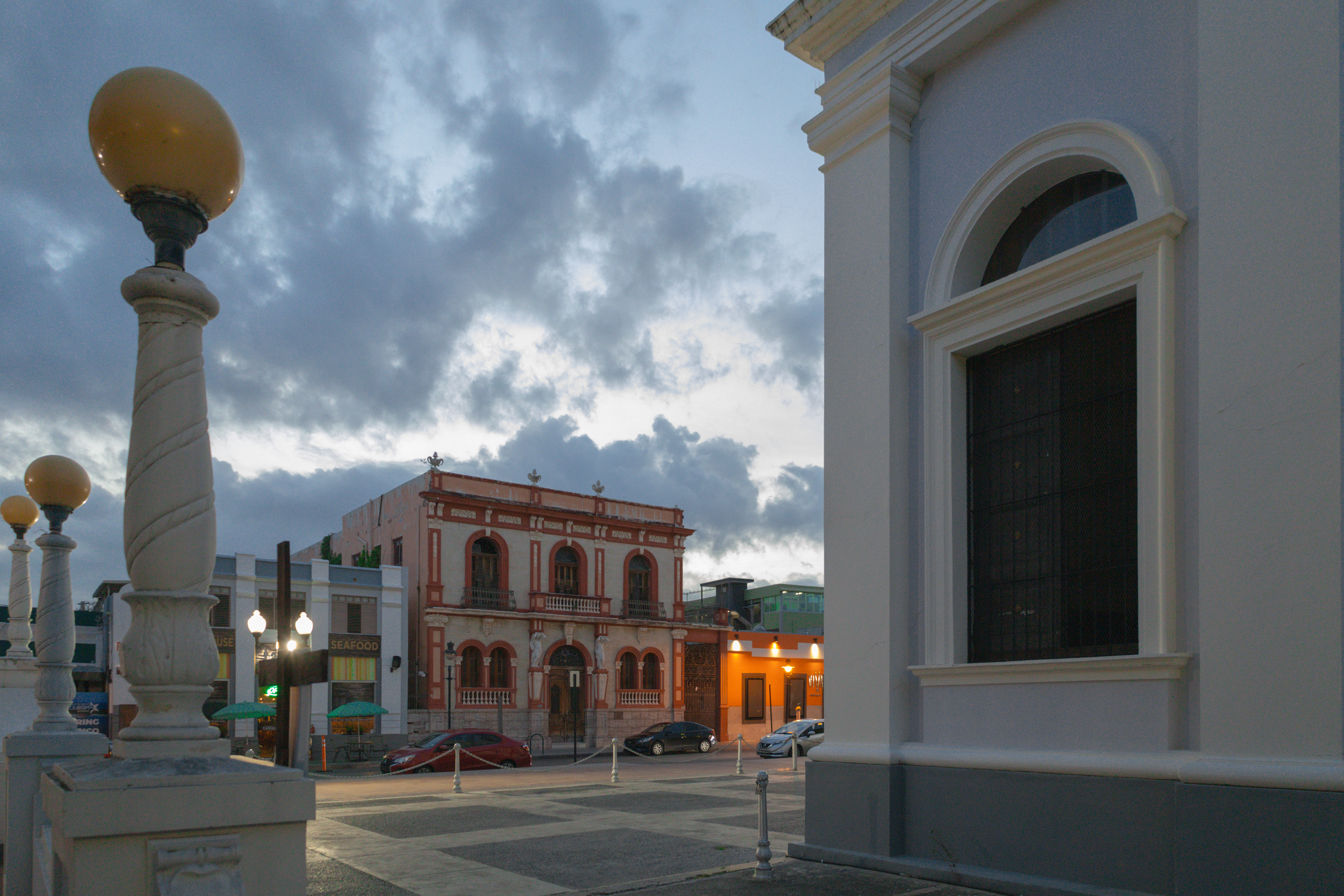
Residencia Armstrong-Poventud across from the cathedral at Plaza Las Delicias

The Casa Armstrong-Poventud Museum is an example of the main Belle-Époque (English: "The Beautiful Epoch"), a French term that is used to describe a long period in European history noted for peace, political stability, and industrial progress. Started around the middle of the 19th century and ran up to World War I. This period of great prosperity coincided with England's Queen Victoria's kingdom (1837–1901) during which industrial and artistic greatness were promoted with such a success that it also came to be known as the Victorian Era.

=== European fairs ===
Unlike previous eras, the level of artistic and industrial prosperity reached during the Belle Époque was such that it reached the masses, in Europe as well as in the Americas. Important exhibitions marked this progress. There was one in England in 1851, and various others followed in various other major cities. There was for example another one in Paris in 1855 that brought about an even larger number of attendees, unprecedented in the history of mankind: 5,100,000 people coming from virtually every existing country. In 1878, Paris celebrated another Fair yet where the telephone and the light bulb were shown for the first time. The city was first lit during this 1878 Paris Fair.

=== Ponce 1882 fair ===
Ponce had its own fair in 1882. It was dedicated to agriculture, commerce, industry and the arts. Just like Paris four years earlier, Ponce was also illuminated on the first day of the Ponce Fair: Plaza Las Delicias, the Unión Mercantil building, the Ponce Casino and some of the most majestic homes in the Majestic City, such as the Armstrong Residence.

=== Ponce's majestic residences ===
The economic affluence in Ponce during the second half of the 19th century was due to great wealth from sugarcane plantations. This made possible the construction of various public works such as the Teatro La Perla, the Ponce aqueduct, and several majestic homes, like Armstrong Poventud Home. The home of Señor Carlos W. Armstrong Toro and lady Eulalia Pou, now known as the Armstrong-Poventud Residence, represents this wealth despite the restrictive colonial Spanish government of the Island at the time.

=== Personal life of Señor Armstrong ===
Señor Carlos Walter Armstrong Toro established his wealth on the agricultural prosperity the Island experienced: first as businessman, later as a banker, and finally as a politician. Mr. Carlos Armstrong Toro had an import/export business that exposed him to the great cities of the world and put him in touch with the architectural styles of the day. He was, for example, a partner in a New York City business. In addition, he was also the Danish consul in Ponce. It was with this background that he ordered the construction of his home in Ponce. Señor Armstrong Toro married lady Eulalia Pou Carreras, on 11 January 1868. Doña Eulalia Pou was herself from a wealthy Ponce family.

== Effects of the 2020 Puerto Rico earthquake ==
The building sustained damage due to the 2020 Puerto Rico earthquake. There are plans to restore the house from the damages it sustained.
