= Luis Porrata-Doría =

Mayor of Ponce, Puerto Rico

103rd Mayor of Ponce, Puerto Rico
- In office 11 November 1898 – 12 September 1899
- Preceded by: José Lloréns Echevarría
- Succeeded by: Albert L. Myer

Personal details
- Born: 1859 Ponce, Puerto Rico
- Died: ca. 1920 Ponce, Puerto Rico
- Spouse(s): Ana Gutierrez de Pando, a.k.a., Ana Pando Romero
- Children: Consuelo (b. ca. 1887), Francisco (b. 1890), Luis, (b. 1892), Lucila (1896)
- Profession: Politician

Luis Porrata-Doría Martin (1859 – ca. 1920) was Mayor of Ponce, Puerto Rico from 11 November 1898 to 12 September 1899. He is best remembered for his forced resignation as mayor following his municipal government's poor response to the Category 5 San Ciriaco hurricane that occurred during his administration.

== Early years ==
His father was a Puerto Rican man and his mother was Spaniard. He married Ana Gutierrez de Pando, a.k.a. Ana Pando Romero, around 1887 and they had 4 children: Consuelo (b. ca. 1887), Francisco (b. 1890), Luis, (b. ca. 1892), and Lucila (b. ca 1896). Porrata-Doria Martin was the father of Ponce architect Francisco Porrata-Doria.

== Mayoral term ==
Porrata-Doría had been a member of the Ponce municipal council in 1886, a decade before he became mayor. Porrata-Doria Martin was named mayor of Ponce by the American military governor of Puerto Rico at the time, Major General Guy Vernon Henry, after Henry removed Lloréns Echevarría as mayor of Ponce on 12 November 1898.

Porrata-Doria worked to contain the legalized prostitution problem in the city as brought up by the political activist and journalist from Ponce, Ramon Mayoral Barnes (pen name, "Canta Claro").

A devastating hurricane, San Ciriaco, had hit the southern coast of Puerto Rico on 8 August 1899. A year earlier the United States had invaded the island and installed a military central government based in San Juan. General Nelson A. Miles had been installed by the President of the United States as the first American military governor of the Island, and Porrata-Doría had been elected mayor by the people of Ponce as was the electoral practice for many decades under the old Spanish system.

Hurricane San Ciriaco, however, proved to be the test of the mayorship of Porrata-Doría. As a result of the impact of the hurricane, a number of demonstrations took place around the island to denounce the poor response of various municipal governments to the disaster. “The most serious demonstration of tension took place in Ponce, where damage and mortality had been extensive, especially for the poor. A large crowd of several hundred indigent residents gathered to denounce Mayor Porrata Doria for not giving the population adequate warning or taking appropriate measures. A detachment of the U.S. Fifth Cavalry broke up the demonstrations, but the mayor was eventually forced to resign.”

At this point the military governor, General Miles, appointed as interim mayor of Ponce the U.S. military commanding officer for Ponce, Major Albert L. Myer. In 1900, Major Myer was replaced by a popularly elected civil mayor, Pedro Juan Rosaly.

In December 1913, Porrata-Doría was president of the Ponce Municipal Assembly.

== See also ==
- List of mayors of Ponce, Puerto Rico
- List of Puerto Ricans

Political offices
Preceded by José Lloréns Echevarría	Mayor of Ponce, Puerto Rico; 11 November 1898 – 12 September 1899	Succeeded by Albert L. Myer
