= Simón Moret Gallart =

Puerto Rican politician

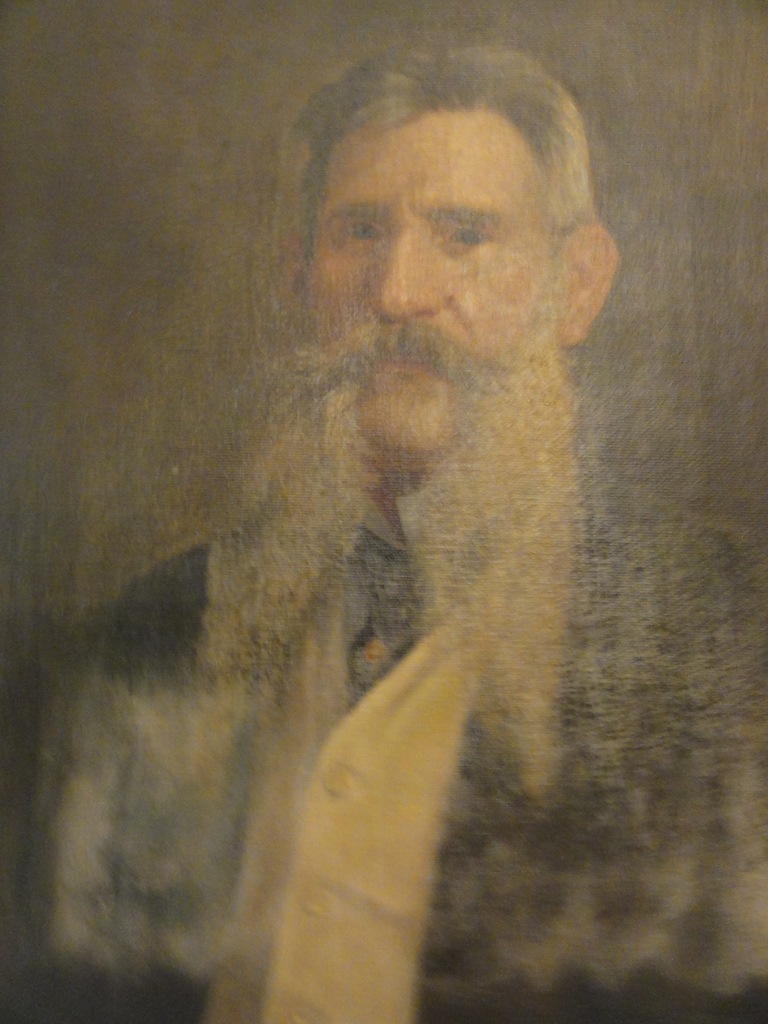
- Mayor Simón Moret Gallart

112th Mayor of Ponce, Puerto Rico
- In office 1907–1914
- Preceded by: Santiago Oppenheimer
- Succeeded by: Rafael Rivera Esbrí

Personal details
- Born: 1853 Ponce, Puerto Rico
- Died: 1923 (aged 69–70)
- Party: Union of Puerto Rico
- Spouse(s): Matilde Perdomo Morales, aka, Matilde Morales y Perdomo de Moret
- Profession: politician

Simón Moret Gallart (1853–1923) was Mayor of Ponce, Puerto Rico, from 1907 to 1914. (Note: Socorro Girón states he was mayor during 1907–1912 (Ponce, el teatro La Perla y La Campana de la Almudaina. 1992. Page 442.))

== Early years ==
Moret Gallart was born in Ponce, in 1853. (Note: Some sources state he was born in 1863; other sources, such as Ancestry.com, state he was born in 1854.) He was a descendant of French immigrant Clemente Moret and the Spaniard Francisca Gallart who settled in Puerto Rico in 1816.

== Mayoral tenure ==
He was elected mayor of Ponce in 1906 and took the oath of office in 1907. He was a member of the Union of Puerto Rico Party and defeated Manuel V. Domenech of the Republican Party in a contested election. In 1911, Mayor Moret received from the Government of the United States of America a franchise for the City of Ponce to operate the Port of Ponce in perpetuity. The port of Ponce has been operated by the municipality since then. It is the only sea port in Puerto Rico owned and administered by a municipal body.

Among Moret's mayoral accomplishments are the construction of the Ponce Firefighters Mausoleum at Cementerio Civil de Ponce, which was completed on 2 April 1911. He also built the Port of Ponce following an ordinance approved by the Consejo Ejecutivo de Puerto Rico in 1911.

== Family life ==
On 11 December 1906, Simón Moret Gallart married Matilde Perdomo Morales. He was 53 and she was 26 when they married. Simón and Matilde had three daughters from their marriage: Josefa, Ana Maria, and Carmen L. In 1910, while mayor, he was a resident of Barrio Segundo, and later, in 1920, he lived in Barrio Quebrada Limón.

== Death ==
He died in Ponce on 30 March 1923 and was buried at Cementerio Católico San Vicente de Paul. In Ponce there was a public school named after him, Elementary School Simón Moret Gallart, located at Carr 504, Km. 0.8, in barrio Portugues. The school ceased operations in 2013 and as of 2015 the Government had put out bids for its demolition.

== Honors ==
Moret Gallart is honored at Ponce's Park of Illustrious Ponce Citizens. Only six other mayors, of over 100 former Ponce mayors, are honored there.

== See also ==
- Ponce, Puerto Rico
- List of Puerto Ricans

== Notes ==
Political offices
Preceded by Santiago Oppenheimer	Mayor of Ponce, Puerto Rico; 1907–1914	Succeeded by Rafael Rivera Esbrí
