= Rosaly–Batiz House =

Historic building in Ponce, Puerto Rico

- U.S. National Register of Historic Places
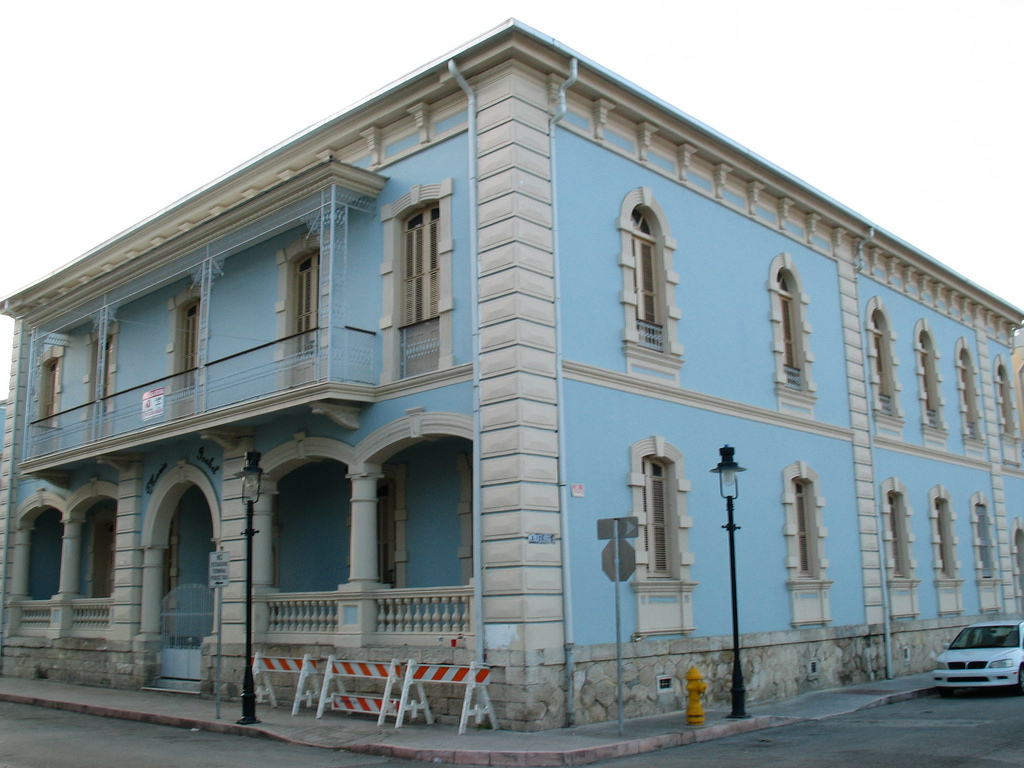
- The Rosaly–Batiz House in Barrio Primero

- Location within Puerto Rico
- Location: 125 Villa St./ Corner of Mendez Vigo St., Ponce, Puerto Rico
- Coordinates: 18°00′39″N 66°36′55″W
- Area: 0.3 acres (0.12 ha)
- Built: 1897
- Architect: Manuel V. Domenech
- NRHP reference No.: 86002768
- Added to NRHP: September 29, 1986

The Rosaly–Batiz House (Spanish: Residencia Rosaly-Batiz) is a historic building located on Villa street in Barrio Primero in Ponce, Puerto Rico, in the city's historic district. The building dates from 1897. It was designed by Manuel V. Domenech, a Puerto Rican architect that was responsible for designing various other now-historic buildings. Domenech built this residence for Ponce mayor Pedro Juan Rosaly. Domenech himself became mayor of Ponce and held numerous other political positions in Puerto Rico. The Batiz Residence is a monument to a great man and his works and a vivid reminder of the aristocracy of the years prior to the Great Depression.

== History and significance ==
The Batiz Residence was built in 1897 by the renown engineer Manuel Domenech for the Mayor of the City of Ponce, Don Pedro Juan Rosaly. A native of Ponce, Domenech graduated from the prestigious Rensselaer Polytechnic Institute of New York and was responsible for many of the island's most lavish turn-of-the-century buildings.

Among Domenech's other designs are the Caryatid House (1910) which faces the Ponce Cathedral and the "Asilo de Pobres" (listed in the National Register on 2 December 1985). Domenech was also Mayor of the City of Ponce and held many governmental positions in Puerto Rico.

Although a particular style cannot be attributed to Domenech, the vocabulary of his designs ranged from the purest Neoclassical to the most intricate eccletic. In this case, Domenech referred to the Renaissance Italian Palazzo as a model, a theme repeated in other properties both in Ponce and Mayaguez. However stern, the Batiz Residence displays a greater degree of mannerism over eclecticism, resulting in one of Ponce's most distinguished structures.

== Sale of the residence ==
The property was purchased in the 1920s as the city residence of Antonio Batiz Olivera, a wealthy coffee plantation owner. During his visits to Ponce the house was said to be filled with light and music. Great balls, concerts and intellectual gatherings characterized the Batiz family and, thus, the house.

The structure has never been altered from what Domenech designed. Only minor maintenance work has been carried out during its many years of forgotten splendor.

The Batiz Residence today is a monument to omenech wnd his works, and a veminder of the aristocracy of the years prior to the Great Depression.

== Physical appearance and description ==
The Batiz Residence is located on the southeast corner of Villa Street at Mendez Vigo Street. It occupies a plot of land 1145 meters square, bordered by Villa Street on the north and Luna Street on the south.

This structure of stuccoed brick and rubble consists of two stories set on a podium approximately four feet above street level. The property follows a U-shaped plan, creating a rectangular courtyard enclosed at the rear by a garden wall. The roof is flat, of wood and brick construction.

The main facade is divided into five bays in an A-B-A rhythm established by a single-bay central section and flanking two-bay sections. Rustic quoins turn the east and west corners of the facade. An italianate cornice spans the roof-line between the rusticated quoins.

At the first level, a recessed loggia is created by an arcade of segmental arches supported by diminished Doric columns on pedestals. Balusters enclose the arcade. The central bay is separated from the rest by a one-storey pair of rusticated pilasters. This bay breaks the podium for access to the main entrance and incorporates a round arch beginning at a point lower than the other arches. Inside the loggia the central doorway is flanked by rusticated segmental arches with full-height, double-shutter jalousies.

A continuous string course separates the first floor from the second. At the upper level there are five rusticated openings similar to those of the first storey. The three inner bays open to a continuous balcony with wrought iron railing in intricate decorative patterns. Iron trellises support a decorative balcony roof.

The west facade is divided by rusticated pilasters into three sections of two, three, and one bay respectively, from north to south. South of the sixth bay extends a one-storey section which serves as a port-cochere. The fenestration at the west facade is similar to that at the main, except with circular arches at the upper level. At the lower level, another circular arch of larger proportions opens at the sixth bay.

The interiors are divided into three separate apartments: two similarly distributed residential units at the first level and a single large apartment at the second. The living quarters, kitchen, and servants' quarters of the upper floor are reached via a series of louvered galleries that open to the courtyard. The living room boasts original crystal chandeliers and electric features. Floors are generally of polished wood and ceilings of ornate pressed sheet-metal. The living room windows open to the balcony which has marble floors and iron railings.

The Batiz Residence serves as an example of the historic architectural trends of Ponce aristocracy.

== See also ==
- Puerto Rico State Historic Preservation Office Files
- Ponce Historic Archives
