= Santiago Oppenheimer =

Puerto Rican politician

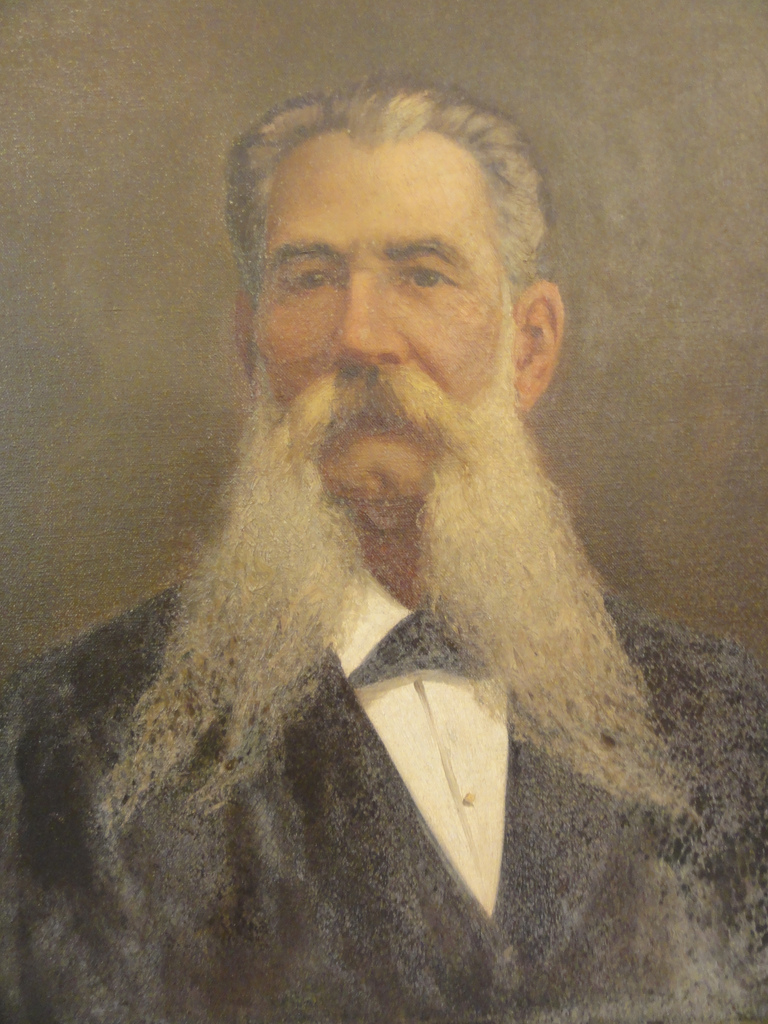
- Mayor Santiago Oppenheimer Van Rhyn (Note: According to Fay Fowlie de Flores, Santiago Oppenheimer's second last name was Bettini (See, Fay Fowlie de Flores. Ponce, Perla del Sur: Una Bibliográfica Anotada. Second Edition. 1997. Ponce, Puerto Rico: Universidad de Puerto Rico en Ponce. p. 330. Item 1650. LCCN 92-75480).)

111th Mayor of Ponce, Puerto Rico
- In office 1906–1906
- Preceded by: Luis P. Valdivieso
- Succeeded by: Simón Moret Gallart

Personal details
- Born: 23 May 1869 Ponce, Puerto Rico
- Died: ca. 1930
- Spouse: Isabel Fugurull
- Children: Alfonso Oppenheimer
- Profession: politician

Santiago Oppenheimer Van Rhyn (Note: According to Fay Fowlie de Flores (Ponce, Perla del Sur: Una Bibliográfica Anotada. Second Edition. 1997. Ponce, Puerto Rico: Universidad de Puerto Rico en Ponce. p. 330. Item 1650. LCCN 92-75480), Santiago Oppenheimer's second last name was Bettini.) (23 May 1869 – ca. 1930) was the Mayor of Ponce, Puerto Rico in 1906. He was also a member of the House of Delegates of Puerto Rico.

Oppenheimer was born in Ponce on 23 May 1869. His parents were Carlos Juan Oppenheimer-Bettini (Note: Carlos Juan Oppenheimer-Bettini (b. ca. 1839 (1869-30 =1839)) was likely brother of Santiago Oppenheimer Bettini (b. ca. 1843), who was the son of Guillermo Gustavo Oppenheimer and Ysabel Bettini, married Enriqueta Dalmau, and had 5 children: Jaime, Ysabel, Enriqueta, Jorge, and Angelina (See: Eli D. Oquendo Rodriguez. A Orillas del Mar Caribe: Boceto histórico de la Playa de Ponce, desde sus primeros habitantes hasta principios del Siglo XX. 2017. page 159.)) and Ana Van Rhyn Mitchell. He married Isabel Fugurull and they had a son named Alfonso. There is a historic house in Ponce named Casa Oppenheimer.

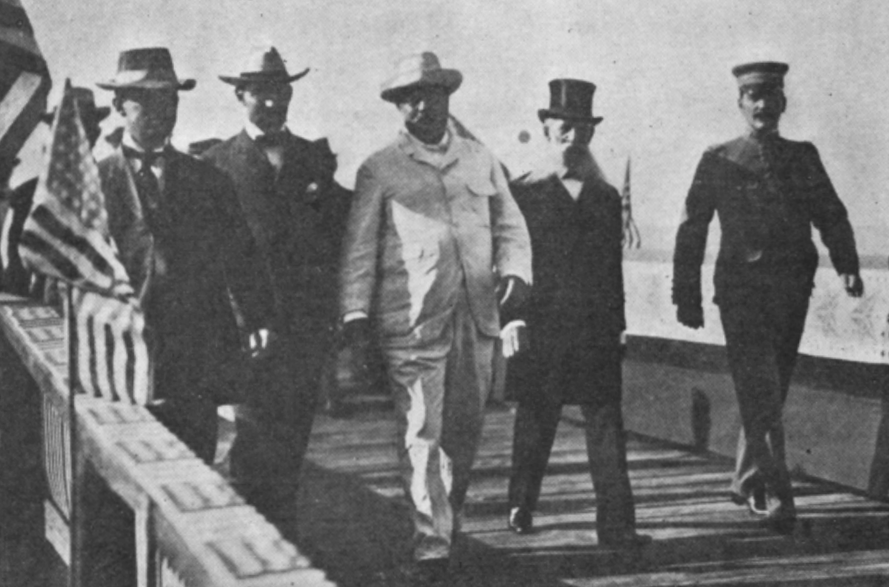
Mayor Oppenheimer (second from the right) walks with President Theodore Roosevelt (in white) on Roosevelt's arrival in Ponce on 21 November 1906

== Mayoral term ==
Several sources state that Oppenheimer was the Ponce mayor who received U.S. President Theodore Roosevelt during his trip to Puerto Rico on 21 November 1906.

== Honors ==
In Ponce, there is a street in Urbanización Las Delicias of Barrio Magueyes named after Oppenheimer.

== See also ==
- List of mayors of Ponce, Puerto Rico
- List of Puerto Ricans

== Footnotes ==
Political offices
Preceded by Luis P. Valdivieso	Mayor of Ponce, Puerto Rico; 1906–1906	Succeeded by Simón Moret Gallart
