= Luis P. Valdivieso =

Puerto Rican politician

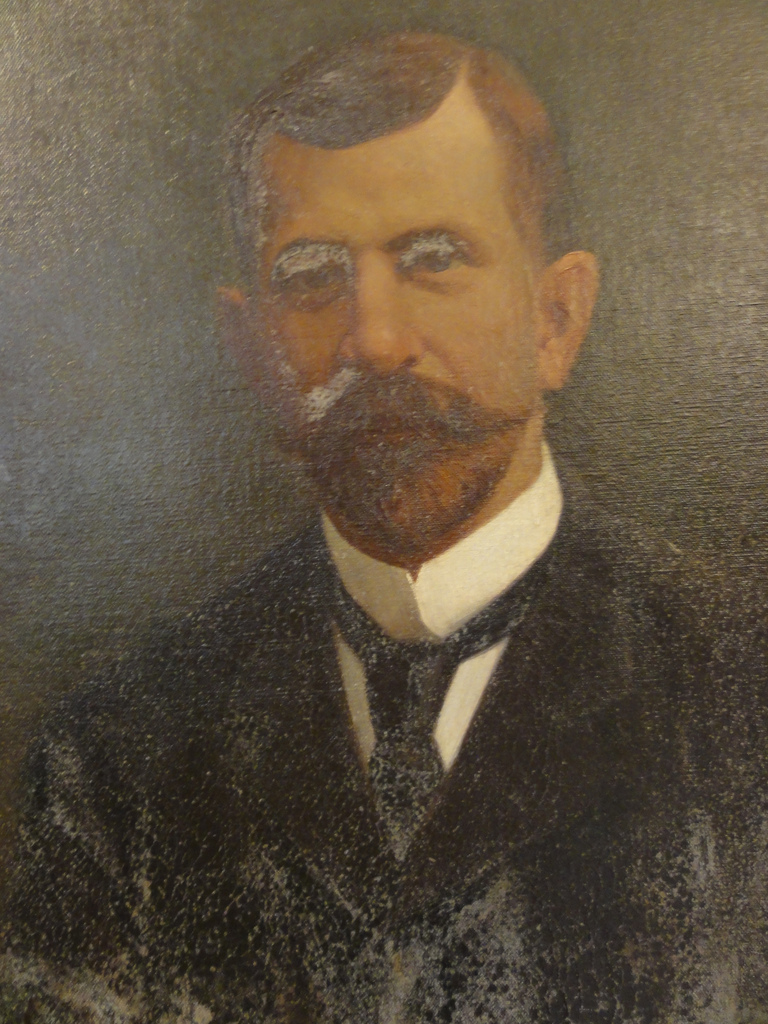
- Mayor Luis P. Valdivieso

110th Mayor of Ponce, Puerto Rico
- In office 1905–1905
- Preceded by: Manuel V. Domenech
- Succeeded by: Santiago Oppenheimer

Personal details
- Born: Ponce, Puerto Rico
- Profession: politician

Luis P. Valdivieso (ca. 1845 – ca. 1920) was the Mayor of Ponce, Puerto Rico, in 1905.

During Valdivieso's term as mayor, the Legislative Assembly of Puerto Rico repealed a law whereby the neighboring municipality of Guayanilla had been annexed to Ponce.

== See also ==
- Ponce, Puerto Rico
- List of Puerto Ricans

Political offices
Preceded by Manuel V. Domenech	Mayor of Ponce, Puerto Rico; 1905–1905	Succeeded by Santiago Oppenheimer
