= Pedro Juan Rosaly =

Mayor of Ponce, Puerto Rico

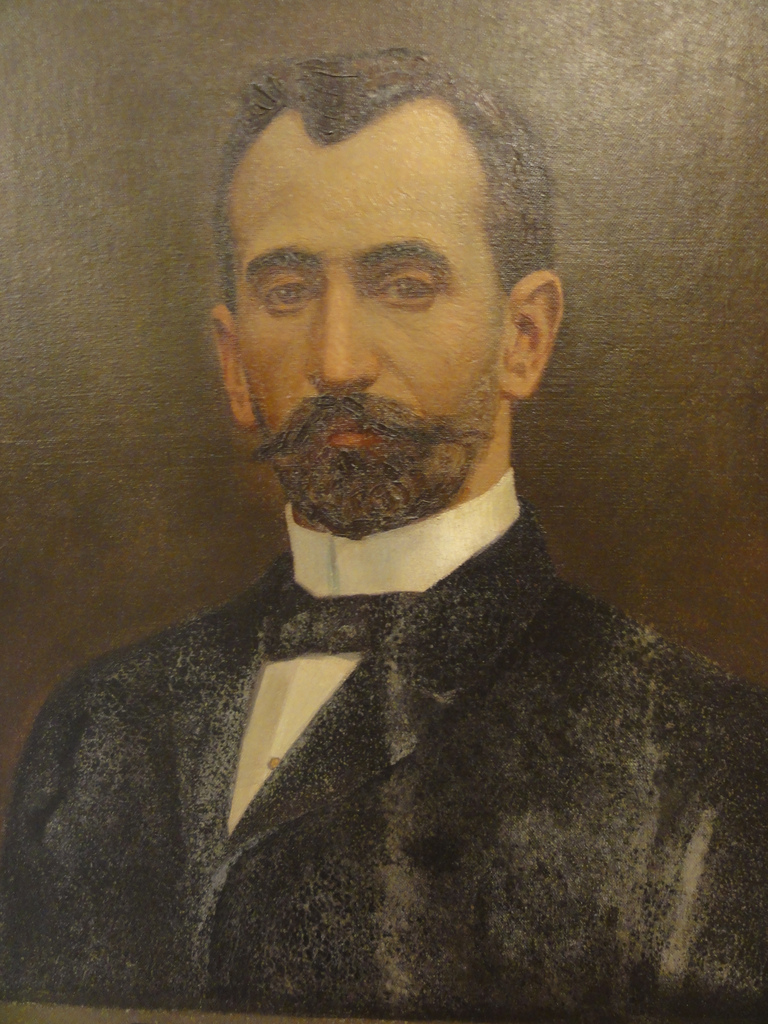
- Mayor Pedro J. Rosaly

105th Mayor of Ponce, Puerto Rico
- In office 23 December 1900 – 28 February 1901
- Preceded by: Albert L. Myer
- Succeeded by: José de Guzmán Benítez

Personal details
- Born: 21 April 1862 Guayanilla, Puerto Rico
- Died: 8 March 1912 Ponce, Puerto Rico
- Resting place: Cementerio Catolico San Vicente de Paul
- Spouse: Enriqueta Cabrera Paz (1871 – 19 Dec 1961)
- Children: Sarah Albizu, aka, Sara Rosaly Cabreara (1891–1980), Pedro Juan Rosaly Cabrera (1892–1951), Enriqueta Rosaly Cabrera Vda. de Vivas (1893–1978), Matilde Rosaly Cabrera (1895–1920), Lillian Rosaly Cabrera (b. ca. 1899)
- Occupation: Hacendado, Banker

Pedro Juan Rosaly Capó (21 April 1862 – 8 March 1912) was Mayor of Ponce, Puerto Rico from 23 December 1900 until 28 February 1901.

== Political career ==
After the elections of 6 November 1900, Rosaly was elected to the Puerto Rico House of Representatives as a representative by the District of Ponce. He joined three other representatives from Ponce and all from the Republican Party: Francisco Parra Capó, Pedro Juan Besosa, Ulpiano R. Colom.

== Hacendado and homeowner ==
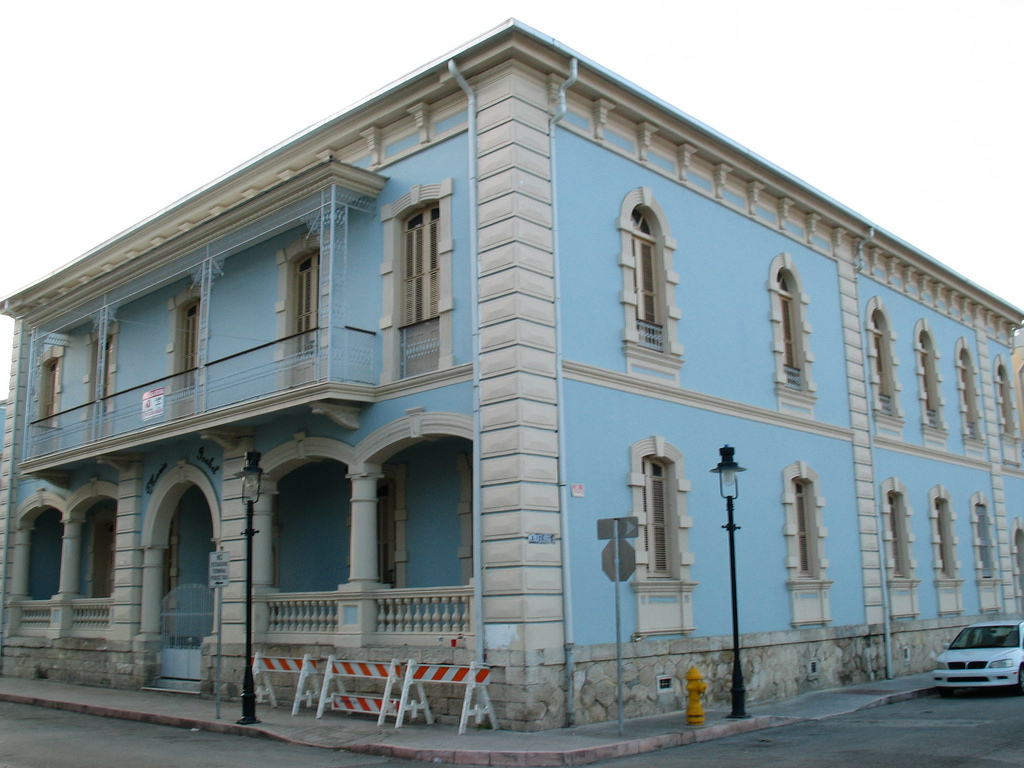
Rosaly's residence while he was mayor of Ponce. The house, now listed in the NRHP, was designed by Manuel Domenech, another political figure.

Pedro Juan Rosaly is best remembered for having a magnificent residence (the Rosaly-Batiz House) built at the corner of Villa and Mendez Vigo streets by renowned architect Manuel V. Domenech and who, four years later, in 1904, himself became mayor of Ponce.

== Banker and businessman ==
Rosaly became the president of Banco de Ponce in the 1940s and established the first branch outside Puerto Rico, in New York City. In 1901, Rosaly became the first person to be granted a franchise to develop local and long-distance telephone service in Puerto Rico. The business plan, however, did not proceed as it was not approved by the president of the United States. (Note: See also http://ut.pr/biblioteca/LibroPR/LPR_Esp/Capitulo_%20X_%20COMERCIO,_FINANZAS_Y_COMUNICACIONES.PDF, "Capítulo X Comercio, Finanzas y Comunicaciones", the same material, but in Spanish.)

== Death and legacy ==
Rosaly died in Ponce on 8 March 1912 and was buried at Cementerio Católico San Vicente de Paul. In Ponce, there is a public housing development named after him.

== See also ==
- List of Puerto Ricans
- List of mayors of Ponce, Puerto Rico

Political offices
Preceded by Albert L. Myer	Mayor of Ponce, Puerto Rico; 23 December 1900 – 28 February 1901	Succeeded by José de Guzmán Benítez
