= Albert L. Myer =

American military mayor of Ponce, Puerto Rico, in 1899

104th Mayor of Ponce, Puerto Rico
- In office 12 September 1899 – 1899
- Preceded by: Luis Porrata Doria
- Succeeded by: Pedro Juan Rosaly

Personal details
- Born: 14 November 1846 Troy, New York
- Died: 16 July 1914 New York City
- Spouse: Wilhelmina Henderson
- Profession: Soldier

Military service
- Allegiance: United States
- Branch/service: United States Army
- Years of service: 1865–1912
- Rank: Brigadier General

Albert L. Myer (Note: His name has sometimes been erroneously spelled "Albert L. Meyer". See, for example, Enciclopedia de Puerto Rico at Categories > Municipalities > Municipalities from O to R > Ponce > Ponce Municipality > Mayors, linked via this link.) (14 November 1846 – 16 July 1914) was a soldier in the United States Army from 1865 to 1912, and interim Mayor of Ponce, Puerto Rico, in 1899 starting on 12 September. He filled as interim mayor of the city after the forced resignation of popularly elected mayor Luis Porrata-Doria.

== Early years ==
Albert Lee Myer was born 14 November 1846, in Troy, New York, to Lt. Col. Aaron B. Myer and Julia A. Myer. Myer went to school in the public education system of Troy. His father was a member of the 125th Regiment of the New York State Volunteer Infantry which was organized at Troy, Rensselaer County, New York. The 125th participated in the Battle of the Wilderness. On May 8, 1863, his father died of the wounds which he received in action during the battle.

On 15 June 1870 he married Wilhelmina Henderson. The couple had two sons, George Henderson Myer and Eagar Myer, both who would eventually join the military. George Henderson Myer, his oldest son, died in 1891, while attending West Point. He was buried in the grounds of the academy.

== Military career ==
Myer enlisted in the United States Army as a private in 1865, and was assigned to Company F, 3rd Battalion, 11th Infantry. In 1868, he took part in the Reconstruction of the South. While participating in the Reconstruction, he was briefly kidnapped and later released by the Ku Klux Klan.

During the U.S. Indian Wars, Myer served in the territory of Arizona as an acting Indian agent in the San Carlos Agency and as a captain in the 11th Infantry in 1896.

In April 1898, he was transferred with the Eleventh Infantry from Fort Whipple in Arizona to Jefferson Barracks, St. Louis, Missouri. The Eleventh Infantry left Jefferson Barracks, Missouri, 19 April 1898, then to a training camp near Mobile, Alabama, via Chickamauga, and on to Tampa, Florida arriving 7 June, for transport to Puerto Rico.

On 12 December 1898, he landed in Guanica with the 11th Infantry as part of the invading forces of General Theodore Schwan. During The Spanish–American War, the Eleventh Infantry saw action under Brigadier General Schwan in the Battle of Silva Heights in the Puerto Rican Campaign. Myer was among the officers who received a distinguished mention in General Schwan's reports, for service rendered under fire during the campaign in western Puerto Rico. Myer and the American Army remained in Puerto Rico where a provisional military government was installed. It was during this time in Puerto Rico that Myer was commissioned to mayor the city of Ponce. Major Myer was appointed by the first military governor of Puerto Rico, Major General Nelson A. Miles.

=== Mayor of Ponce, Puerto Rico ===
On 8 August 1899, while the provisional American military government ruled Puerto Rico, the devastating Hurricane San Ciriaco hit Ponce and the southern coast of Puerto Rico. General Nelson A. Miles had been installed by the President of the United States as the first American military governor of the Island, and Francisco Porrata Doria had been elected mayor by the people of Ponce as was the custom for many decades under the former Spanish system.

San Ciriaco, however, proved to be the test of the mayorship of Porrata Doria. As a result of the impact of the hurricane, a number of demonstrations took place around the island to denounce the municipal governments’ poor response to the disaster. “The most serious demonstration of tension took place in Ponce, where damage and mortality had been extensive, especially for the poor. A large crowd of several hundred indigent residents gathered to denounce mayor Porrata Doria for not giving the population adequate warning or taking appropriate measures. A detachment of the U.S. Fifth Cavalry broke up the demonstrations, but the mayor was eventually forced to resign.”

At this point the military governor of the Island, General Miles, appointed Major Albert L. Myer, then U.S. military commanding officer for Ponce, as interim mayor of the municipality. Major Myer did not, as intended, perform all the functions of the mayor. Instead he assumed only some of the authority of the municipal government. Despite the mayoral change, however, tensions remained high, with the blame being placed back and forth on various factions. In 1900, Major Myer was replaced by popularly elected civil mayor Pedro Juan Rosaly. In December 1900, Myer together with the 11th Infantry Regiment left Puerto Rico and returned to the United States.

== Post-Puerto Rico military career ==
Myer continued his service to the U.S. Army and, in 1906, he became a member of the Military Order of the Loyal Legion of the United States. Also in 1906, he was assigned 600 men to assist in the cause of the San Francisco Earthquake. On 23 March 1907, Myer was promoted to brigadier general by President William Taft during the Second Cuban Campaign. In 1912, he was the Commanding Officer of the Field Artillery School in Fort Sill, Oklahoma.

== Death ==
On 16 July 1914, while at his home in New York City, Myer suffered a stroke that took his life. His funeral was held three days later, on July 19, in New York City where he received full Military Honors by a detachment of the Watervliet Arsenal. He is buried at Section G-C plot of the Oakwood Cemetery in Troy, New York.

== See also ==
- List of mayors of Ponce, Puerto Rico
- List of Puerto Ricans

== Notes ==
Political offices
Preceded by Luis Porrata Doria	Mayor of Ponce, Puerto Rico; 12 September 1899 – 1899	Succeeded by Pedro Juan Rosaly
