= Antonio Arias (mayor) =

Puerto Rican politician

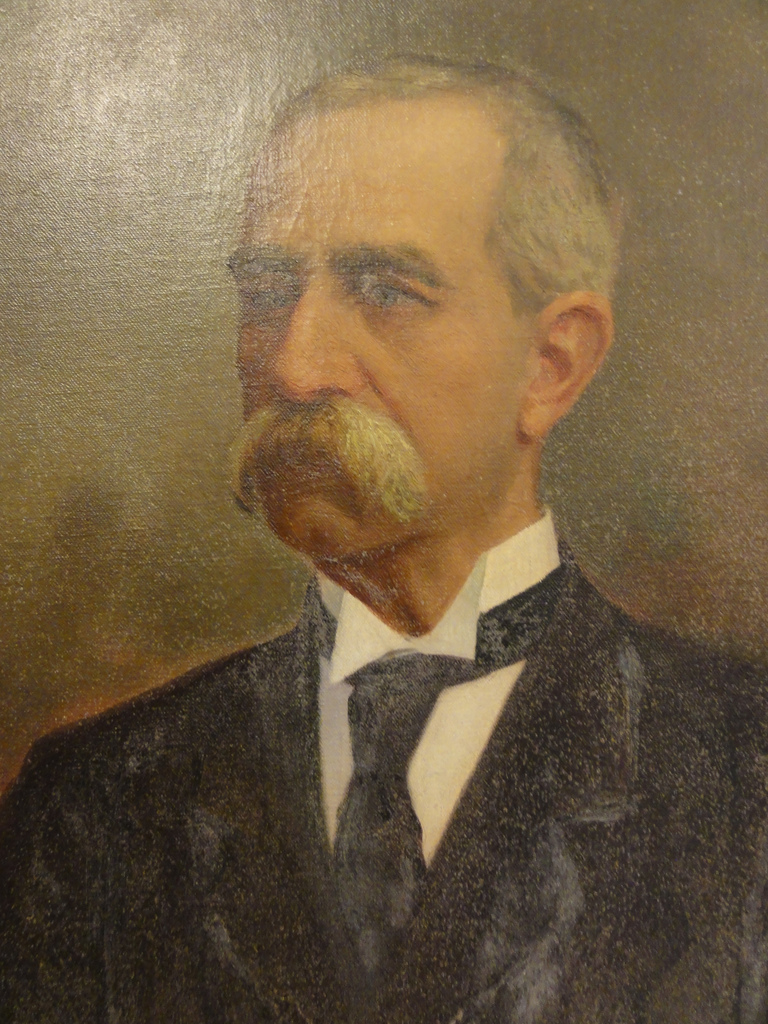
- Mayor Antonio Arias

108th Mayor of Ponce, Puerto Rico
- In office 1903–1903
- Preceded by: Enrique Chevalier
- Succeeded by: Manuel V. Domenech

Personal details
- Born: c. 1847 Ponce, Puerto Rico
- Died: 4 July 1913 Ponce, Puerto Rico
- Spouse: Rosalía Ríos Ovalle
- Profession: Politician

Antonio Arias Suñé (c. 1847 – 4 July 1913) was the mayor of Ponce, Puerto Rico from 1903 to 1904.

== Biography ==
Arias Suñé was born in Ponce around 1847. His parents were José María Arias Tellechea, from Venezuela, and Mercedes Suñé. He married Rosalía Ríos Ovalle, with whom he had seven children: Jose Maria, Rodulfo, Angel, Teodoro, Rosa Maria, Rafael, and Carlos Juan. Arias Suñé died on 4 July 1913.

== Mayoral term ==
Due to a new law that had been passed in the Puerto Rico Legislature the previous year (1902), which annexed the municipality of Guayanilla to the municipality of Ponce, mayor Arias Suñé was, in effect, the mayor of Guayanilla as well, during his one-year term as mayor of Ponce. Once no longer mayor of Ponce, Arias returned to Guayanilla to oversee that municipality in the unofficial post as Guayanilla's mayor. The law was repealed in 1905, after which Guayanilla elected its own mayor again. Arias Suñé resigned his post on 23 June 1904. Among public works legacy of mayor Arias is the "town hall" of Barrio Playa, built on the northeast corner of Calle Padre Noel (then Calle Virtud) and Calle Alfonso XII. The building cost $4,253.48, plus $400 for the lot, both in 1903 dollars. The structure was used for barrio offices of sanitation, police, and firemen.

== See also ==
- List of Puerto Ricans
- List of mayors of Ponce, Puerto Rico

Political offices
Preceded by Enrique Chevalier	Mayor of Ponce, Puerto Rico; 1903–1903	Succeeded by Manuel V. Domenech
