= José de Guzmán Benítez =

Puerto Rican politician (1857–1923)

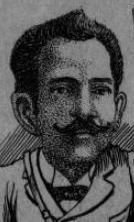
- Detail of drawing of José de Guzmán Benítez (by Mario Brau de Zuzuárregui)

106th Mayor of Ponce, Puerto Rico
- In office 28 February 1901 – 1902
- Preceded by: Pedro Juan Rosaly
- Succeeded by: Enrique Chevalier

Personal details
- Born: 1857 Ponce, Puerto Rico (Note: His Death Certificate ("Acta de Defunción") states his was born in Fajardo, Puerto Rico (See Puerto Rico, Civil Registrations, 1885-2001 for José De Guzmán Benitez. Defunciones (Deaths), Santurce, Defunciones 1918-1924. Folio 235. Acta Numero 824. Departamento de Salud de Puerto Rico. Registro Civil de San Juan. Tomo 1. Julio 1 de 1918 a Marzo 27 del 1919. Santurce, Puerto Rico.))
- Died: 28 October 1923 (aged 65–66) San Juan, Puerto Rico
- Spouse: Carmen Soto Rodriguez
- Children: Jose Ignacio (1884–1941)
- Profession: Attorney

José de Guzmán Benítez (1857 – 28 October 1923) was Mayor of Ponce, Puerto Rico, from 28 February 1901 until 1902. José de Guzmán Benítez is best known for his 1899 campaign initiative, presented to the people of Puerto Rico, asking for the creation of a pro-American political party.

== Early years ==
Guzmán Benítez was born in 1857 to Manuel De Guzman and Modesta Benitez. He married Carmen Soto Rodriguez, from Sabana Grande, Puerto Rico, with whom he had a son named Jose Ignacio (1884–1941).

== Mayoral term ==
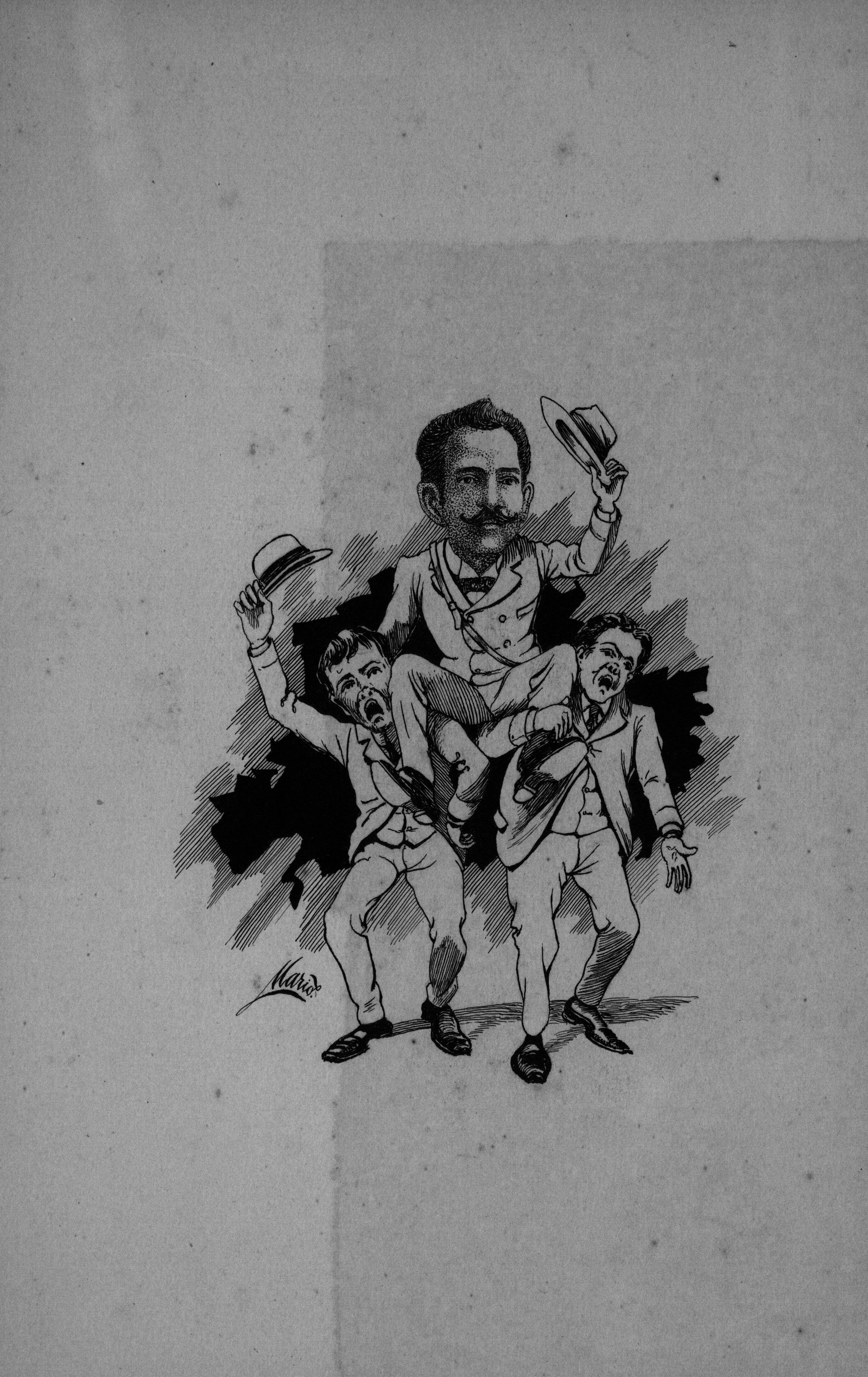
Fans carry Mayor De Guzmán Benítez upon his winning the 1900 elections

Guzmán Benítez, along with his chief of police Rodulfo Figueroa were regarded by the Federal Party as "highly controversial" figures due to their association with members of Ponce's lower class. The Republican side of Ponce's Municipal Assembly, meanwhile, demanded Guzmán Benítez's resignation but a crowd of Ponce residents, numbering some two thousand, took over the halls of the Assembly building, coming to Guzmán Benítez's defense.

A caricature was made of De Guzmán Benítez of his 1900 election win that is well preserved. The 1900 election was significant in that it was the first election since the United States invaded the Island in 1898.

With the arrival of the Americans in Puerto Rico in 1898, De Guzmán Benítez proposed the creation of a pro-American political party. The proposal caught the attention of Jose Celso Barbosa, leader of the Partido Ortodoxo de Puerto Rico (Orthodox Party of Puerto Rico). Celso Barbosa held a party assembly in San Juan to which De Guzmán Benítez was invited. The 4 July 1899 assembly resulted in the creation of the Partido Republicano de Puerto Rico (Republican Party of Puerto Rico).

== Death ==
De Guzmán Benítez died in San Juan, Puerto Rico, on 28 October 1923, as a result of a cardiac arrest, more specifically an asystole. He was 67 years old.

== See also ==
- List of Puerto Ricans
- List of mayors of Ponce, Puerto Rico

== Notes ==
Political offices
Preceded by Pedro Juan Rosaly	Mayor of Ponce, Puerto Rico; 28 February 1901 - 1902	Succeeded by Enrique Chevalier
