= Enrique Chevalier =

Puerto Rican politician

107th Mayor of Ponce, Puerto Rico
- In office 1902–1902
- Preceded by: José de Guzmán Benítez
- Succeeded by: Antonio Arias

Personal details
- Born: c. 1856 Ponce
- Died: 19 July 1931 Ponce
- Profession: businessman

Enrique Chevalier Chardón (c. 1856 – 19 July 1931) was the Mayor of Ponce, Puerto Rico, in 1902.

== Background ==
Chevalier Chardón was born in Ponce around 1856. His parents were Juan Felix Chevalier and Ramona A. Chardón. He married Antonia Valdivieso Ortiz with whom Chevalier Chardón had a daughter named Antonia. He died in Ponce on 19 July 1931. A member of the Partido Republicano Puertorriqueño, Chevalier had also been a member of the Ponce municipal assembly before becoming mayor.

== Mayoral term ==
In 1902, the Puerto Rico Legislature approved a law that annexed the municipality of Guayanilla to the municipality of Ponce. As such, during his one year as mayor of Ponce, Mayor Chevalier was effectively the mayor of both Ponce and Guayanilla. The law was repealed in 1905. In terms of medical care, Chevalier is also credited with establishing the position for a municipal physician to care for the medical needs of residents in the growing Barrio Playa. The municipal ordinance established that the person occupying such position was to be a resident of that barrio. While he was a member of the Partido Republicano Puertorriqueño, his mayoral term was marked by an ayuntamiento led by the opposition, the Union of Puerto Rico party.

== See also ==
- List of mayors of Ponce, Puerto Rico
- List of Puerto Ricans

Political offices
Preceded by José de Guzmán Benítez	Mayor of Ponce, Puerto Rico; 1902–1902	Succeeded by Antonio Arias
