= Ulpiano Colóm =

Puerto Rican politician (1861–1906)

Ulpiano Colom
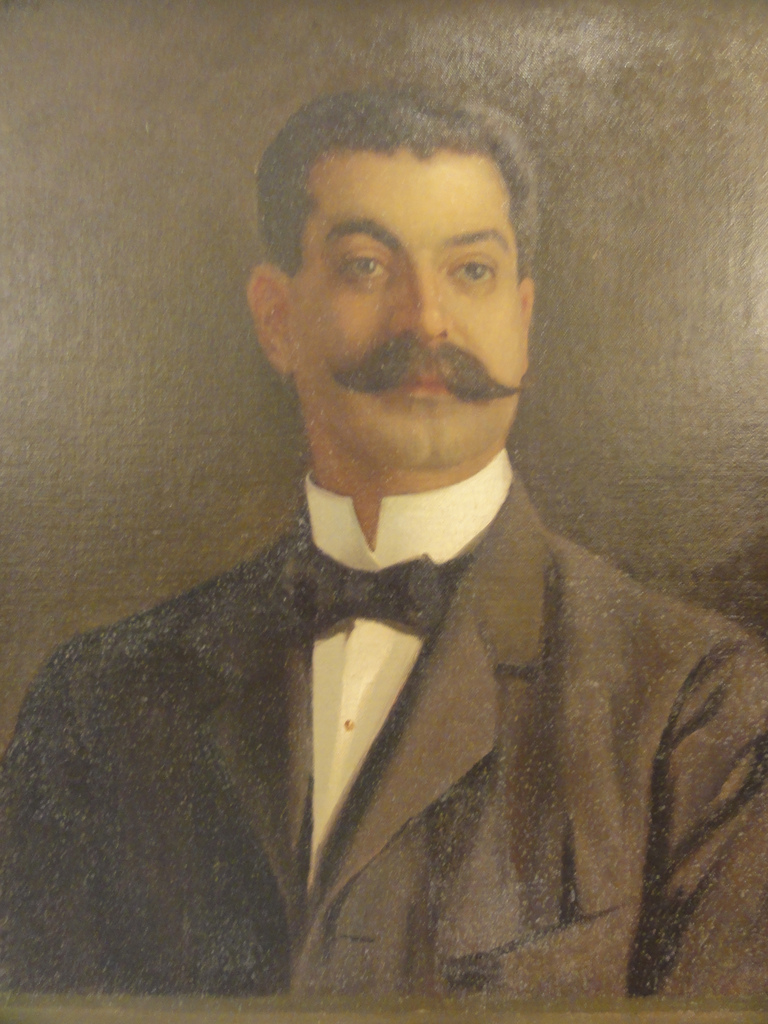
- Mayor Ulpiano Colom y Ferrer

101st Mayor of Ponce, Puerto Rico
- In office 8 July 1898 – 1898
- Preceded by: Luis Gautier
- Succeeded by: José Lloréns Echevarría

Personal details
- Born: 3 April 1861 Ponce, Puerto Rico
- Died: 13 February 1906 Ponce, Puerto Rico
- Spouse: Mrs. Martinez de Colom
- Children: Eloisa (b. 1888), Belem (b. 1889), Jose Enrique
- Profession: Attorney, Banker, Politician

Ricardo Ulpiano Colom y Ferrer (Note: According to Eduardo Neumann Gandia, the spelling of Ulpiano Colom's last name (Colom) does not have a diacritical mark over the second "o" of "Colom". See Eduardo Neumann Gandia. Verdadera y Auténtica Historia de la Ciudad de Ponce. (San Juan, Puerto Rico: Instituto de Cultura Puertorriqueña. 1913.) Page 52. Accessed 14 June 2018.) (3 April 1861 – 13 February 1906) was Mayor of Ponce, Puerto Rico, during part of 1898. He was the second of two mayors to lead the municipality of Ponce under the Spanish Crown's "Decreto Autonómico para Puerto Rico", whereby Puerto Rico was granted autonomy by Spain.

== Early years ==
He was born in Ponce, Puerto Rico on 3 April 1861. His parents were José Colom and Belen Ferrer.

He was an attorney, a member of the House of Delegates of Puerto Rico, a councilman for the municipality of Ponce, an assistant in the Ponce Fire Department, a director and vice-president of the Banco Crédito y Ahorro Ponceño, and a municipal judge, among the various other positions he held.

== Mayoral term ==
Colom y Ferrer became mayor of Ponce on 8 July 1898. He was the sitting mayor of Ponce at the time when the Americans took possession of the city on 28 July 1898. Upon the American invasion, Colom tendered his resignation, but it was not accepted by the American Major General James H. Wilson, who instead extended Colom's jurisdiction to additional adjacent towns as the American troops advanced.

== Death and legacy ==
Colom Ferrer died in Ponce on 13 February 1906 as a result of an "ataque de angina de pecho" (chest angina). He was interred at the "Antiguo Cementerio de esta Ciudad", today's (2019) Panteón Nacional Román Baldorioty de Castro. In Ponce there is a street in Urbanización Las Delicias of Barrio Magueyes named after him.

== See also ==
- List of Puerto Ricans
- List of mayors of Ponce, Puerto Rico

== Notes ==
Political offices
Preceded by Luis Gautier	Mayor of Ponce, Puerto Rico; 8 July 1898–1898	Succeeded by José Lloréns Echevarría
