= Manuel V. Domenech =

Puerto Rican politician

Manuel V. Domenech Ferrer
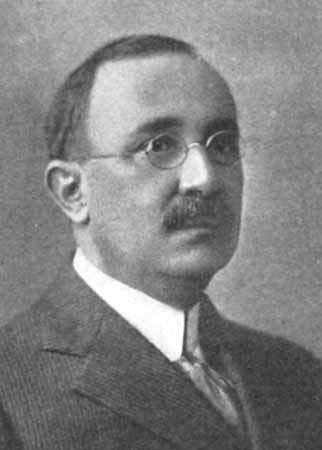

109th Mayor of Ponce, Puerto Rico
- In office 1904–1904
- Preceded by: Antonio Arias
- Succeeded by: Luis P. Valdivieso

Treasurer of Puerto Rico
- In office 1930–1935
- Preceded by: Juan G. Gallardo
- Succeeded by: Rafael Sancho Bonet

Personal details
- Born: 23 March 1869 Isabela, Puerto Rico
- Died: 15 March 1942 (aged 72) San Juan, Puerto Rico
- Party: Republican
- Education: Lehigh University
- Profession: Politician, Architect

Manuel V. Domenech Ferrer (23 March 1869 – 15 March 1942) was a Puerto Rican politician and engineer. He was mayor of Ponce in 1904, and designer of Casa Armstrong-Poventud, Rosaly-Batiz House, and the 1898 Casas Gemelas (Twin Houses) built for Luis Casals, among others prominent structures.

== Early years ==
Domenech was born in Isabela, Puerto Rico, on 23 March 1869. He graduated from Lehigh University, Pennsylvania, United States in 1888. Domenech was also educated at Rensselaer Polytechnic Institute. Studying at Lehigh University exposed Domenech to life in the state of Pennsylvania at a time when that state was experiencing accelerated development in modernistic architecture. Likewise, his education at Rensselaer exposed him to the most advanced techniques in engineering and architecture training available at the time. Located in Troy, New York, Rensselaer also exposed the young student to a region experiencing a great amount of growth and architectural transformation during his time there.

== Political career ==
After his return to Puerto Rico, he became a member of the House of Representatives from 1900 to 1902, and mayor of Ponce in 1904. In 1914 he was named Commissioner in the United States Department of the Interior, becoming one of the first Puerto Rican to hold a presidentially appointed Puerto Rico Cabinet position. Later he was Treasurer of Puerto Rico, from 1930 to 1935. In various occasions he also served as Acting Governor of Puerto Rico. Domenech attended the 1928 Republican National Convention in Kansas City, Missouri as an alternate delegate.

== Engineer ==
Domenech is also known to have acted as municipal architect for the city of Ponce. He was a civil engineer and, in 1914, also rehabilitated the house where "King of Tenors" Antonio Paoli was born and grew up.

== Death and burial ==
Domenech died in 1942 in San Juan, Puerto Rico. He is buried at Puerto Rico Memorial Cemetery in Carolina, Puerto Rico.

== Honors ==
After his death, a major roadway in Hato Rey, Puerto Rico, was named after him. Domenech is also honored at Ponce's Park of the Illustrious Ponce Citizens. In Ponce, there is a street in Urbanizacion Las Delicias of Barrio Magueyes named after him.

== See also ==
- List of Puerto Ricans

Political offices
Preceded by Antonio Arias	Mayor of Ponce, Puerto Rico; 1904–1904	Succeeded by Luis P. Valdivieso
