= Puerto Rico Department of Public Safety =

- Departamento de Seguridad Pública de Puerto Rico

Department overview
- Formed: April 10, 2017; 9 years ago
- Preceding department: Commission on Safety and Public Protection
- Jurisdiction: Commonwealth of Puerto Rico
- Headquarters: San Juan, Puerto Rico
- Department executive: Alexis Torres, Secretary of Public Safety
- Key document: 20. 2017.
- Website: www.dsp.pr.gov

The Puerto Rico Department of Public Safety (PR DPS) (Spanish: Departamento de Seguridad Pública de Puerto Rico) is the umbrella organization within the Executive branch of Puerto Rico that agglomerates the Puerto Rico Law Enforcement and Emergency Response agencies in the U.S. Commonwealth of Puerto Rico. The department was formed on April 10, 2017, when then-Governor Ricardo Rosselló signed into law a bill to unify all safety agencies. All agencies are bureaus of the department.

== Agencies overseen ==
The following agencies are under the umbrella organization of the department. All of these agencies have their own director or commissioner:

- Puerto Rico Police Bureau
- Puerto Rico Firefighters Bureau
- Medical Emergency Bureau
- Bureau for Emergency and Disaster Management
- Puerto Rico Special Investigations Bureau
- 9-1-1 Bureau

The Puerto Rico Forensic Sciences Institute was part of the Department for three years until it once again became an independent agency.

== List of secretaries ==
- 2017 - May 2019: Héctor Pesquera
- May 2019 - December 2019: Elmer Román
- December 2019 - January 2021: Pedro Janer
- January 2021 - present: Alexis Torres
