= Raúl Márquez Hernández =

Puerto Rican lawyer

Secretary of State of Puerto Rico
- In office August 31, 2020 – January 2, 2021
- Governor: Wanda Vázquez Garced
- Preceded by: Elmer Román
- Succeeded by: Larry Seilhamer

Personal details
- Born: San Juan, Puerto Rico
- Party: New Progressive
- Education: University of Puerto Rico, Río Piedras (BA); Pontifical Catholic University of Puerto Rico School of Law (JD); Interamerican University of Puerto Rico School of Law (LLM)

Raúl Márquez Hernández is a Puerto Rican lawyer who served as the Secretary of State of Puerto Rico since August 31, 2020 till January 2, 2021. He was the campaign director of Wanda Vázquez Garced during the 2020 Puerto Rico gubernatorial election. Márquez Hernández was as a contractor and advisor for the legislators Ricardo Llerandi, Gabriel Rodríguez Aguiló, and mayor Carlos Molina and worked closely with Gabriel Rodríguez Aguiló.

Márquez Hernández completed a B.A. at University of Puerto Rico, Río Piedras and a J.D. at Pontifical Catholic University of Puerto Rico School of Law. He earned a LL.M. at Interamerican University of Puerto Rico in litigation and alternate dispute resolution in 2016.

Political offices
Preceded by Elmer Román	Secretary of State of Puerto Rico; 2020–2021	Succeeded by Larry Seilhamer
