= Secretary of Public Safety of Puerto Rico =

Government official responsible for leading the Puerto Rico Department of Public Safety

- Incumbent; Arturo Garffer since January 2, 2025
- Department of Public Safety
- Style: Mr. Secretary
- Member of: Cabinet
- Reports to: Chief of Staff
- Seat: San Juan, PR
- Nominator: Governor of Puerto Rico
- Appointer: Governor of Puerto Rico with advice and consent from the Senate
- Term length: At the pleasure of the governor
- Precursor: Commissioner of Safety and Public Protection
- Formation: April 10, 2017; 9 years ago, 20. 2017.
- First holder: Héctor Pesquera
- Salary: $180,000 USD
- Website: www.pr.gov

The secretary of public safety of Puerto Rico (Spanish: secretario de seguridad pública de Puerto Rico) leads the Department of Public Safety, with its agencies, in all matters of law enforcement and emergency response. The position and department was formed in April 2017, when Governor Ricardo Rosselló signed into law the unification of the emergency service agencies in Puerto Rico. The secretary overlooks the actions of the agencies but does not have direct control over them.

== List of secretaries ==
- 2017 - May 2019: Héctor Pesquera
- May 2019 - December 2019: Elmer Román
- December 2019 - January 2021: Pedro Janer
- January 2021 – present: Alexis Torres
