= Puerto Rico Firefighters Corps =

Puerto Rico Fire Department

Coordinates: 18.451387°N 66.040173°W

Negociado Cuerpo de Bomberos de Puerto Rico
Agency overview
- Established: May 9, 1942
- Employees: 900 uniformed 264 civilian
- Staffing: Career
- Fire chief: Marcos Concepción Tirado
- EMS level: BLS
- Motto: Willpower and Sacrifice

Facilities and equipment
- Stations: 96
- Engines: 140
- Trucks: 5 ladders 1 tower
- Squads: 44
- Rescues: 4
- Fireboats: 1

Website
- www.bomberos.pr.gov

The Puerto Rico Firefighters Corps (Spanish: Cuerpo de Bomberos de Puerto Rico), abbreviated CBPR, is the statewide fire department that provides fire protection, rescue, and protection from other hazards in Puerto Rico. It was established in 1942 under the Puerto Rico Fire Services. In addition, it offers fire protection services to all the airports under the authority of the Puerto Rico Ports Authority, Rafael Hernández Airport, and Mercedita Airport and they serve as crash rescue divisions. A separate agency, the Puerto Rico Medical Emergency Corps, provides emergency medical services to all Puerto Rico.

== History ==
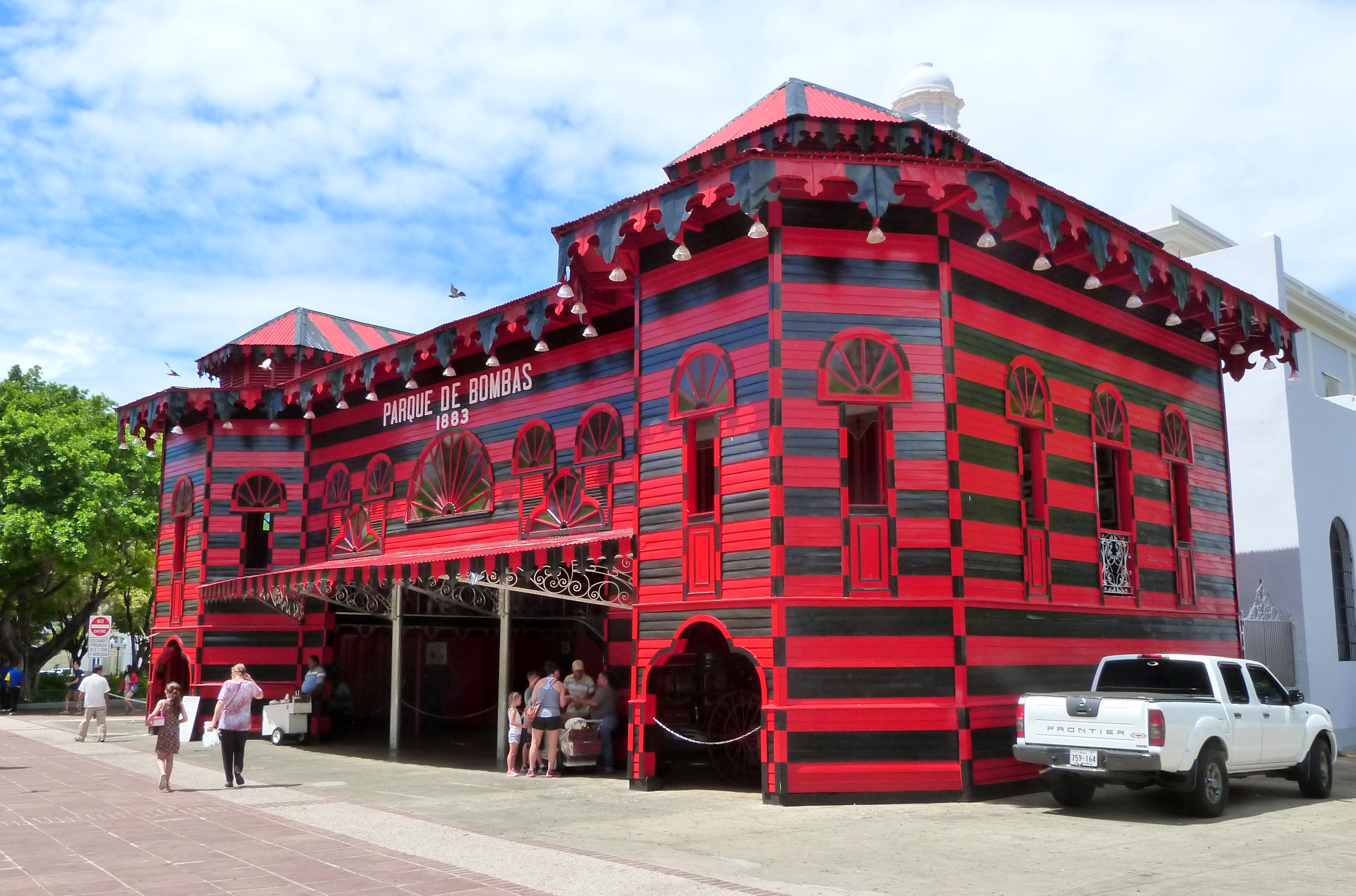
Ponce's Parque de Bombas was Puerto Rico's first firehouse and today is a firefighting museum

Puerto Rico firefighters have their origins in the southern town of Ponce. In 1823, Spanish Governor Miguel De La Torre, became deeply concerned by a large fire that occurred in Ponce, on February 27, 1820. This fire almost destroyed the town. As a result, it became mandatory for every male between 16 and 60 years to be a volunteer firefighter. Firefighters at this time had to provide their own fire-fighting tools such as picks, shovels, and buckets. Unfortunately, this first fire corps saw its decline once Governor De La Torre left his post.

Another major fire occurred in the Playa de Ponce sector of Ponce in 1845. This moved the Conde de Marisol, ruler of the island at that time, to create a new voluntary fire-fighting organization. In 1862, under the auspices of the mayor of Ponce, Luis Quijano Font, the fire corps was reorganized as The Fire Services and Thomas Cladellas was appointed Fire Chief.

In 1879, the Fire Services reorganized again, this time under the leadership of Ponce architect Juan Bertoly. Finally, Puerto Rico's fire fighting force reorganized in a more permanent manner in 1883 while Maximum Meana was mayor of Ponce. It consisted of 400 firefighters. Its officers were Julio Steinacher, Juan Seix (Senior Chief), Oscar Schuch Oliver (Second Chief), and Fernando M. Toro (Head Brigade and Charge of the Academy of Gymnastics).

On January 25, 1899, Pedro Sabater and Rafael Rivera Esbri, were among a group of firefighters fighting a fire in the U.S. powder magazine barracks, near today's Ponce High School in downtown Ponce. There were stored at that location large quantities of bullets, ammunition, and gunpowder. Had the fire reached this munition depot, it would have surely destroyed the whole town. These heroes saved the lives of many people and saved the town of a conflagration.

In 1918, the Mayoral brothers built the first motorized pump in Puerto Rico, using the chassis of a Pope Hartford. In 1930, Raul Gándara joined the Ponce Fire Service as Lieutenant; he would later become Puerto Rico's first Fire Chief.

=== Island-wide fire services ===
In 1942, the Puerto Rico Legislature passed Act #58 of May 9, 1942, also known as "The Fire Service of Puerto Rico Act", in which the Puerto Rico Insular Fire Services was created. The governor of the island at the time, Rexford Guy Towell selected Raul Gandara as fire chief. Mr. Gandara was, at the time, captain of the Ponce Fire Corps.

Later, in 1953, it was called the Puerto Rico Fire Services, because of the new formed Commonwealth of Puerto Rico. By that time, they were using Mack trucks bought from the United States, specialized for fire extinguishing. On December 9, 1993, Law #58 was amended and it was called until this day as the "Cuerpo de Bomberos de Puerto Rico". On May 12, 2010, Carmen I. Rodriguez Diaz became the first woman in the history of the Cuerpo de Bomberos to become Chief of the CBPR.

=== Employment disputes ===
In 2005, Kathy Rodriguez-Vives sued the Commonwealth of Puerto Rico, claiming that the Puerto Rico Firefighters Corps had refused to hire her because of her gender.

In 2022, Puerto Rican firefighters took to the streets to march with other public employees in protest of their starting salary of $18,000.

== Division/Bureaus ==
The CBPR is divided into different businesses and divisions to get a provide more effective fire protection coverage for the communities. These are:

=== Fire Extinction Bureau ===
This program provides firefighting, rescue and emergency and disaster situations, protection from natural disasters and coordinates interaction with other agencies in operations. It also handles emergency calls in situations of accidents, disasters and hazardous materials spill.

As a secondary responsibility to attend the Fire Prevention program acting as a preventive nature, as is the education of young people of school age, "Bomberito" program, guidance on areas and sites of assembly and inspection and elimination of fire hazards and research to determine the origin and causes of these. The 9-1-1 Emergency System, which centralizes emergency calls and faster response to the call of the community. It serves the people in general throughout the island.

=== Fire Prevention and Education ===
This program has the responsibility to develop and implement measures to eliminate fire hazards and educate the community about them. It is also responsible for inspecting industrial, commercial, commercial, institutional, residential, educational workshops, stores and meeting places to ensure compliance with the rules and basic requirements of fire prevention. Under Law 148 of 22 December 1994, empowering the charge for inspection services, reading and endorsement of plans as well as community education on preventive measures and use by the Fire Corps of proceeds.

=== Training Bureau ===
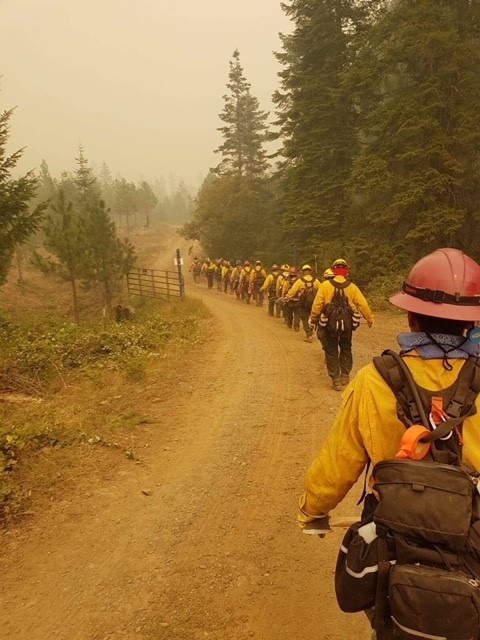
Puerto Rico Fire Fighters at Sugar Pine, Miles Fire, Bella Vista, California, 2018

This program is responsible to train and retrain all members of the Fire Brigade in the latest techniques of fire suppression, prevention, rescue and first aid. This training and retraining program for firefighters and inspectors in the latest fighting techniques and fire prevention. Provides retraining for fire prevention officers and training of employees in private industry. And provides the latest fighting techniques and fire prevention to employees so they are prepared for any emergency.

=== General Management and Administration ===
This program is responsible for planning the work that will fulfill the public policy of the Fire Corps, provisions of its organic law, the Governor's executive orders and other mechanisms to safeguard life and property. It also establishes the procedures to provide management support to implement the planning process and implementation of operational activities of each program. Serves all employees of the Agency to other programs and other government agencies. This program provides accounting, budget, procurement, audit, general services, mail, human resources, information systems, legal, public relations and transportation. This program is located the office of Fire Chief. In establishing this public policy, manages and supports other operational program.

=== Special Operations Division ===
The "Division de Operaciones Especiales" (DOE) (Special Operations Division) is responsible for incidents that require specialized equipment or the emergency is one of critical levels for the population, such as large-scale fires, fuel spills or hazardous materials, landslides, searching for people in rubble, among others. All 6 Fire Corps zones have a Special Operations Division station. Your staff is chosen not only for their years of service, but also for their physical and mental. Every member is trained in fire and accident prevention, search for people in debris, use of specialized equipment, hazardous materials, among others.

== Organization ==
The CBPR is divided in various areas. The management area consists of the divisions of Finance and Budget, Purchasing and Supply, Information Systems, Property, General Services and inactive files. The extinction area consists of six (6) areas and (12) twelve Districts. The area of Prevention consists of the Prevention Inspection divisions and Endorsements, Technical Drawings and Certifications, Fire Research and Education at the Community. These divisions are established within six (6) zones. In the Training Area is the Fire Academy and Fire Volunteers. CBPR chain of command is as follows:

- Fire Chief/Jefe de Bomberos
- Vice-Chief/Jefe Adjunto
- Battalion Commander (Chief of Operational Area)/Comandante del Batallón
- District Chief/Jefe del Distrito
- Station Captain/Estación Capitán
- Lieutenant/Teniente
- Sergeant/Sargento
- Firefighter/Bombero

=== Ranks ===
Firefighter no bugles	Sergeant 3 Chevrons	Lieutenant 1 bugle
Captain 2 either traditionally side by side or less usually crossed bugles	District Chief 2 either side by side or more traditionally crossed bugles	Division Chief/ Assistant Deputy Chief 3 crossed bugles
Deputy Chief 4 crossed bugles	Fire Chief 5 crossed bugles	

== Operational areas ==
The Puerto Rico Fire Corps was reorganized through General Order 98–1. Under it there are six (6) operational areas located in Aguadilla, Arecibo, Carolina, Caguas, Ponce and San Juan. With eleven (11) districts located in: San Juan, Bayamón, Carolina, Rio Piedras, Caguas, Humacao, Ponce, Guayama, Mayagüez, Aguadilla and Arecibo. The district respond from 91 fire stations island-wide and are supported by the District Special Operations Division, which performs functions such as fire-rescue and "First Response" with the ambulance service and medical emergencies.

== Notable incidents ==
=== Dupont Plaza fire ===
On the evening of December 31, 1986, a group of employees of the Dupont Plaza Hotel in the San Juan tourist district placed opened cans of a flammable liquid commonly used in chafing dishes in a storage room adjacent to the ballroom on the first floor of the hotel. The employees then ignited the flammable liquid, but the fire quickly burned out of control; then, the fire stated to burn the second floor where the casino was packed of people; and then, thick black smoke covered the rest of the floors. And to make matters worse, the hotel was filled of American tourists and local citizens. Around 3:40 p.m., the nearest firehouse, the San Juan Metropolitan Station, received the first call. Later on scene, 14 fire trucks, more than 100 firefighters and 35 ambulances responded to the call. Later that evening, 4 helicopters including National Guard and State Police started airlifting people from the rooftop of the hotel to the beach on the back of the hotel. In the end, 97 people died. Most of them died of smoke inhalation, others died burned beyond recognition, and 140 people were injured. The cause of the fire was criminal arson, because of economic problems between employees and employers. This made the Dupont Plaza Hotel arson the most deadly fire In Puerto Rican history.

=== Humberto Vidal Explosion ===
The Humberto Vidal explosion was a gas explosion at the Humberto Vidal shoe store, located in the Río Piedras area of San Juan, Puerto Rico, that killed 33 people and injured 69 others when the five-story building collapsed on February 21. November 1996. It is speculated that the probable causes of the explosion were due to negligence and lack of training of the employees and supervisors of the gas company with the name of San Juan Gas Company. It is considered one of the worst disasters on the island.

The explosion occurred around 8:35 in the morning on Thursday, November 21, 1996, in the middle of a bustling commercial center in Río Piedras. The six-story building that housed shoe, jewelry and music stores as well as the headquarters of the Humberto Vidal Shopping Center were literally destroyed and later demolished.

The immediate theory was that the origin of the explosion was a bomb planted by clandestine paramilitaries as an act of subversion. But there were no traces of explosive elements nor were flammable or incendiary materials found, which could have been used.

The President of the United States, Bill Clinton, declared a disaster area and the victims were helped with federal resources, including the assistance of the National Transportation Safety Board (NTSB), which initiated the investigation. The San Juan Gas Company, owned by Enron Corporation, disclaimed responsibility, mentioning that they did not supply gas service to the building at the time of the explosion.

=== Gulf Refinery explosion ===
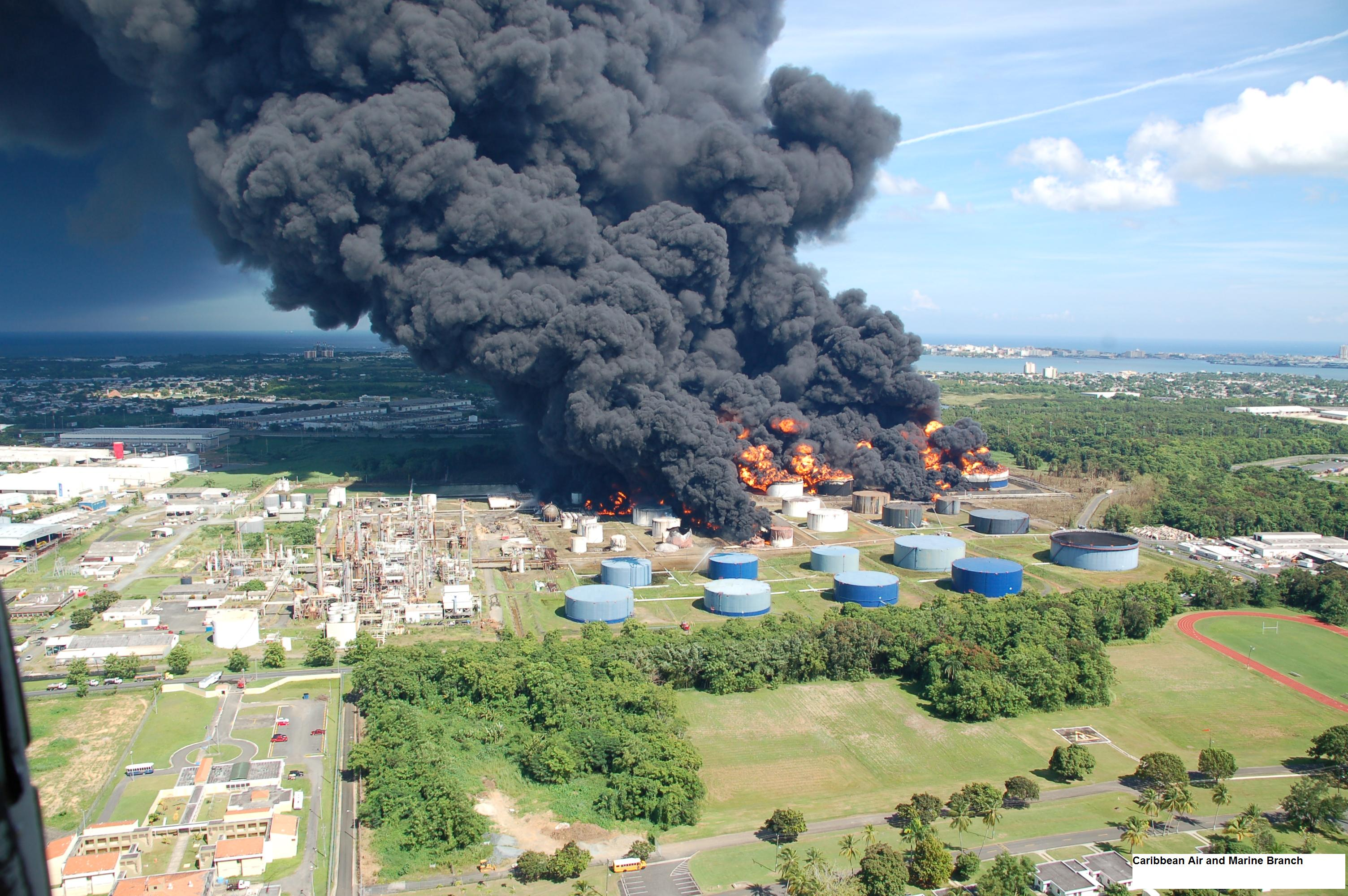
The Cataño oil refinery fire on October 23, 2009.

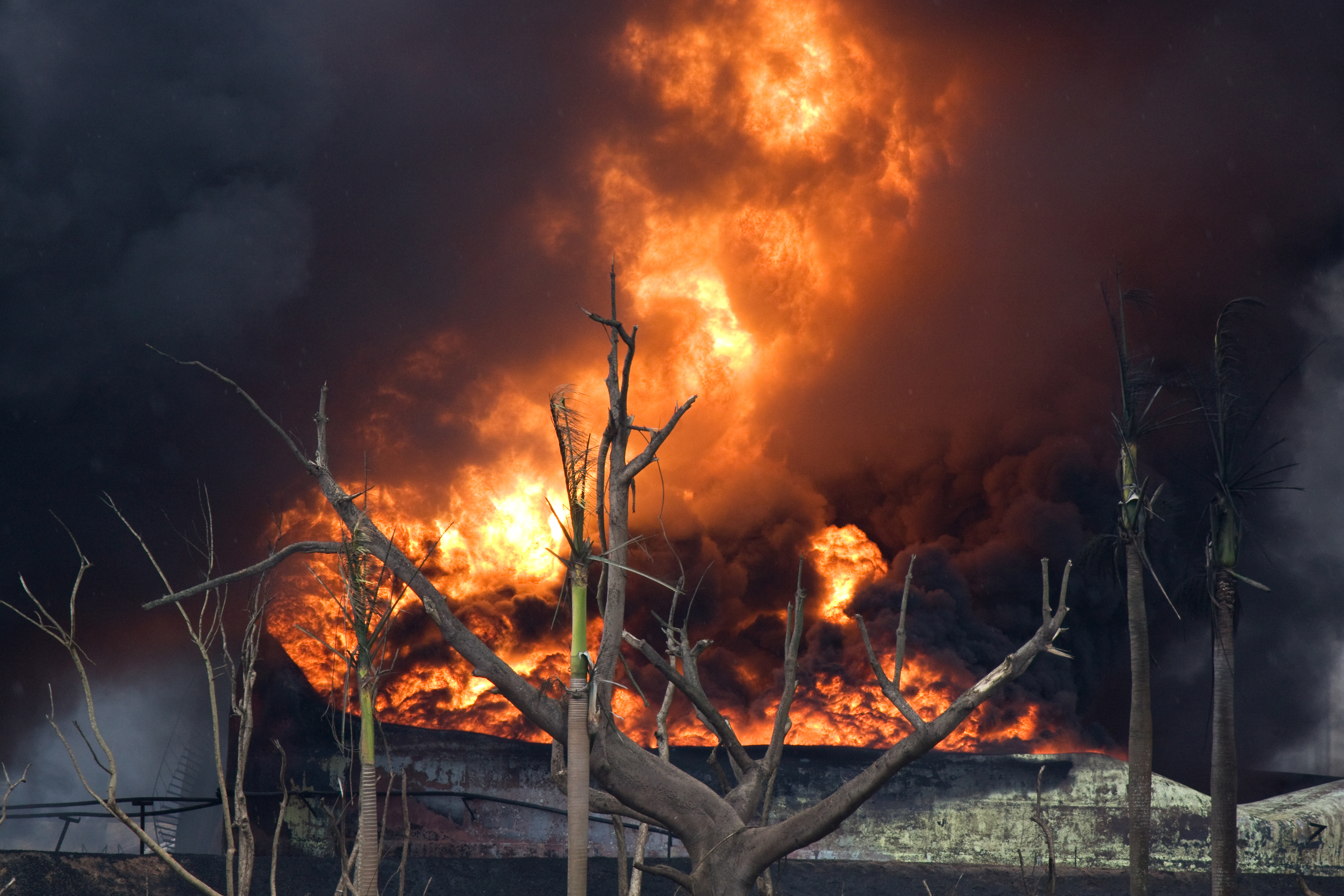
One of the oil tanks in flames.

On October 23, 2009, at 12:23 AM, seven oil storage tanks from the Caribbean Petroleum Corporation (CAPECO) in Bayamón, Puerto Rico, exploded causing an expansive wave from the epicenter into a five-mile radius. Puerto Rico Fire Corps units from the towns of Bayamón, Cataño, and Guaynabo arrived at the scene 15 minutes after the explosion. An hour later, fire units from San Juan, Toa Baja, and the municipal fire units from San Juan, Bayamón, and Carolina arrived to assist in what was considered to be the biggest fire explosion in Puerto Rico's history. The communities of Puente Blanco and Fort Buchanan were evacuated. The explosion was heard as far away as the town of Cidra. On the afternoon of the explosion, units from Ponce, Caguas, and Arecibo joined on the firefight. Governor Luis Fortuño declared a state of emergency on that area, and President Barack Obama separately declared a federal state of emergency in Puerto Rico, clearing the way for federal agencies to coordinate disaster relief and authorizing the use of federal funds. Personnel from the Federal Emergency Management Agency (FEMA), Bureau of Alcohol, Tobacco and Firearms (ATF), Federal Bureau of Investigation (FBI), the U.S. Chemical Safety and Hazard Investigation Board (CSB), and the Department of Homeland Security arrived in Puerto Rico starting October 24 to investigate the fire.

The Puerto Rico National Guard was activated to help the local units with logistics in the area. The fire was contained two days later, on the night of October 25. Though there were no deaths, six people were injured, including one firefighter who was affected by smoke inhalation. The cause of the explosion is still being investigated. However, many questions have surfaced, and the investigation continues without a clear understanding of the events that night.

== Photos ==
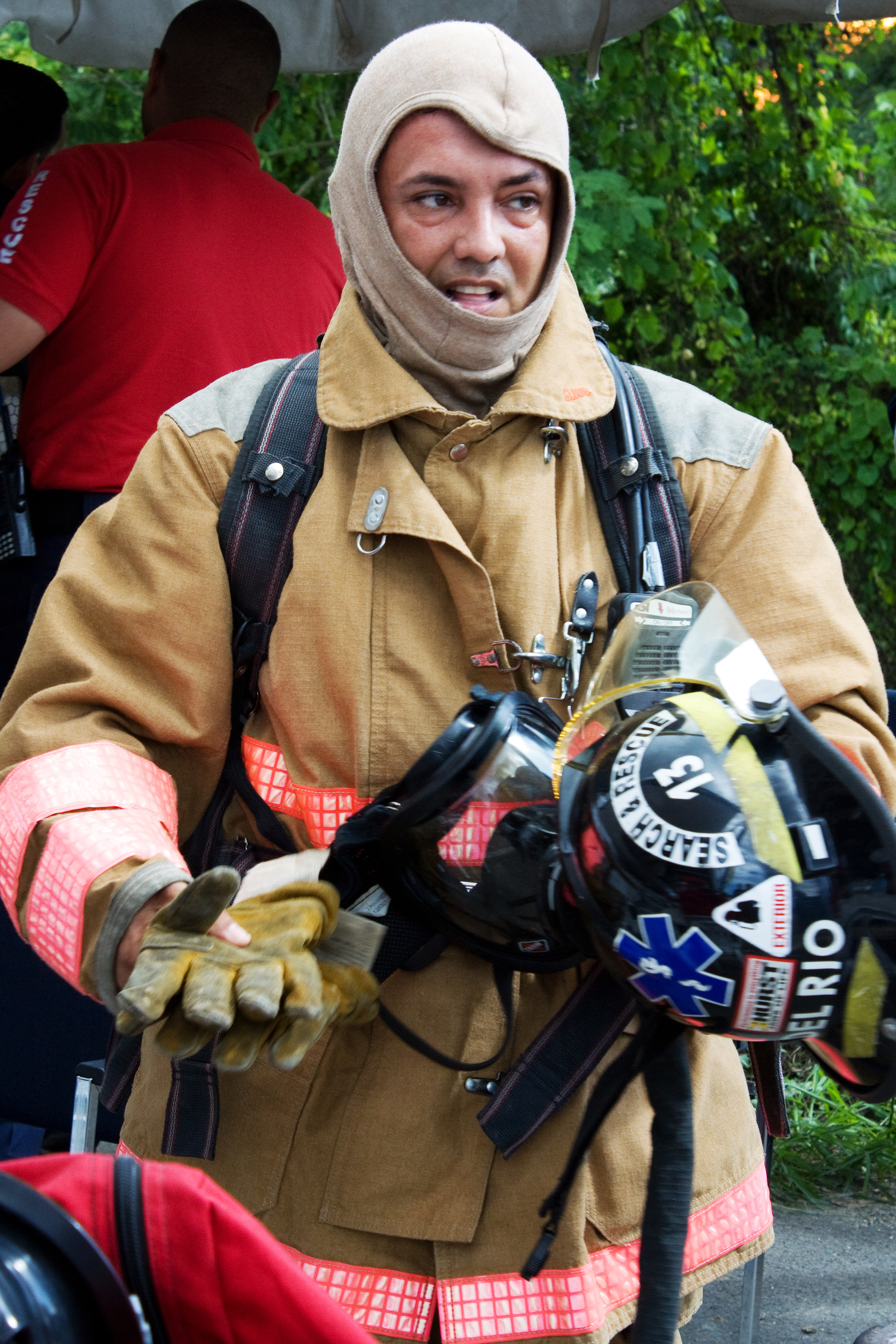
A CBPR firefighter preparing to enter a flaming building.

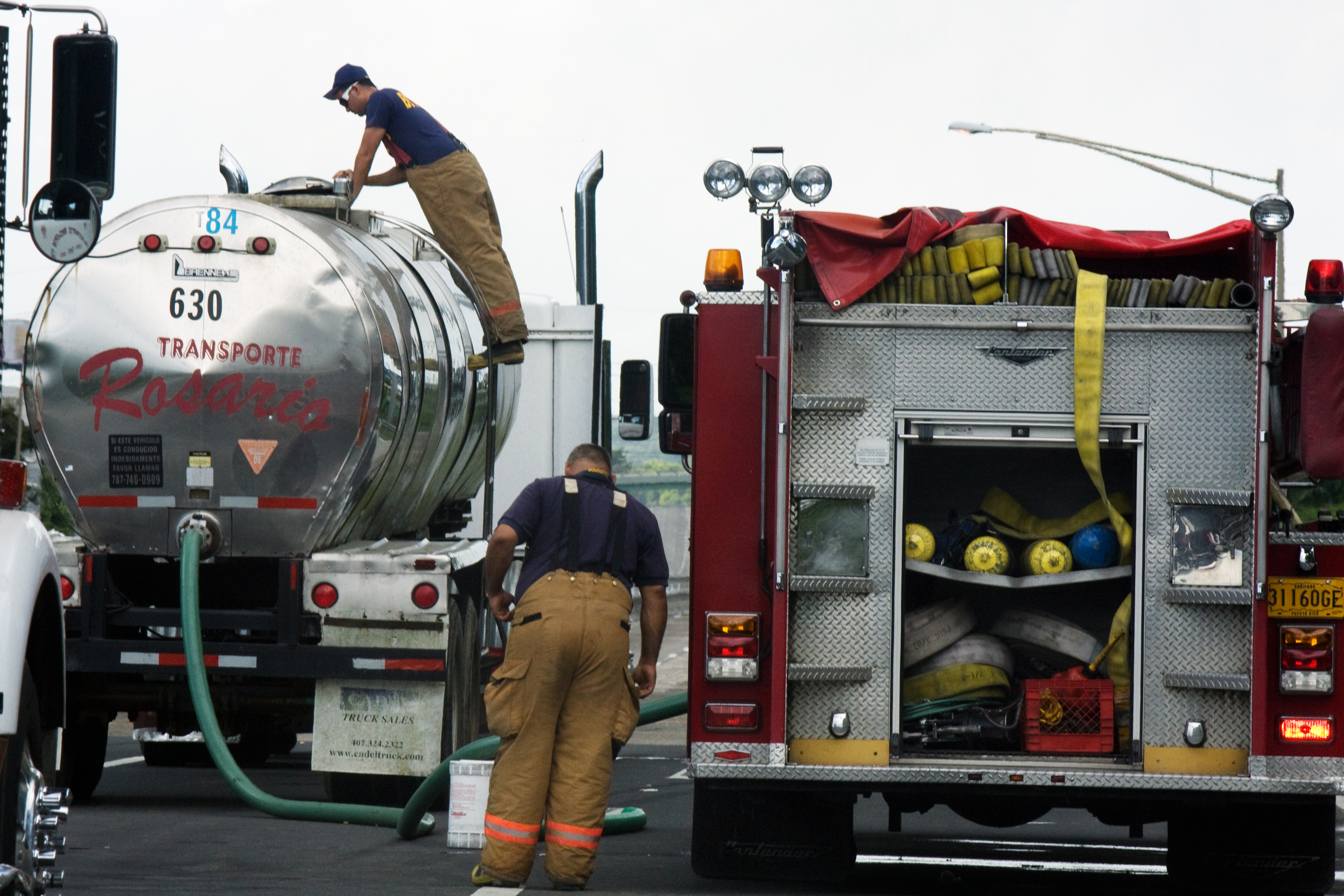
A water storage truck transferring water to a CBPR engine.
