= Elmer Román =

Puerto Rican government official and U.S. naval military officer

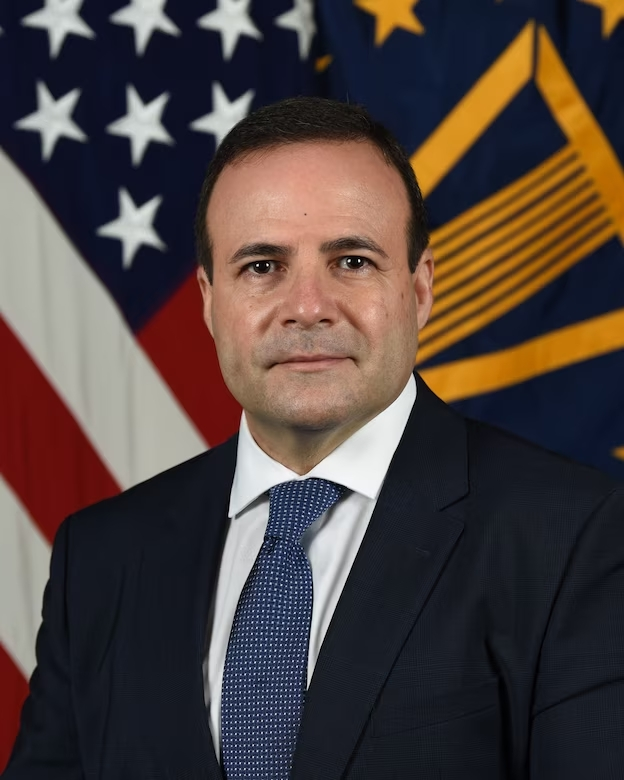

United States Assistant Secretary of the Navy for Energy, Installations and Environment
- Acting
- In office July 22, 2025 – December 23, 2025
- President: Donald Trump
- Preceded by: Brenda Johnson-Turner (acting)
- Succeeded by: Brendan P. Rogers

Secretary of State of Puerto Rico
- In office December 20, 2019 – August 20, 2020
- Governor: Wanda Vázquez Garced
- Preceded by: María Marcano de León (acting)
- Succeeded by: Raúl Márquez Hernández

2nd Secretary of Public Safety of Puerto Rico
- In office April 9, 2019 – December 20, 2019
- Governor: Ricardo Rosselló; Wanda Vázquez Garced
- Preceded by: Héctor M. Pesquera
- Succeeded by: Pedro Janer

Personal details
- Born: Yauco, Puerto Rico
- Party: New Progressive
- Other political affiliations: Republican
- Education: University of Puerto Rico, Mayagüez (BS); Virginia Tech (MS); Colorado Technical University
- Civilian awards: Navy Meritorious Civilian Service Award
- Website: Campaign website

Military service
- Allegiance: United States
- Branch/service: United States Marine Corps; United States Navy
- Rank: Captain
- Unit: 4th Light Armored Reconnaissance Battalion; United States Navy Reserve
- Battles/wars: Iraq War
- Military awards: Meritorious Service Medal (2); Navy and Marine Corps Commendation Medal; Navy and Marine Corps Achievement Medal; Joint Meritorious Unit Award

Elmer L. Román is a member of the U.S. Senior Executive Service (SES) and a senior naval military officer. Additionally, he is a Puerto Rican politician who ran for the position of Resident Commissioner of Puerto Rico in Washington, D.C. as part of the New Progressive Party primaries of 2024. He lost the primary to Puerto Rican Senator and former Chief of Staff of Puerto Rico, William Villafañe.

== Early life and education ==
Román was born in Yauco, Puerto Rico. As a teenager he joined the Civil Air Patrol (CAP) where he reached the rank of cadet Colonel. He received the General Carl A Spaatz Award. Only 0.5% of cadets nationwide earn this award.

Román earned his Bachelor of Science in Mechanical Engineering from the University of Puerto Rico at Mayagüez and his Master of Science in Systems Engineering from Virginia Tech. His academic pursuits also include executive courses at the John F. Kennedy School of Government and an ongoing doctorate in administration at Colorado Technical University.

Román graduated from boot camp at Marine Corps Recruit Depot Parris Island and officer training in the United States Marine Corps Officer Candidates School. He is also a graduate of the United States Navy Senior Engineering Duty Officer School and the Federal Executive Institute, part of the United States Office of Personnel Management.

== Military career ==
Román's military career began enlisting in the United States Marine Corps in 1991. Was Platoon Sergeant with the 4th Light Armored Reconnaissance Battalion, he later graduated from the United States Marine Corps Officer Candidates School at Marine Corps Base Quantico. After serving active duty in the Marines, he transitioned to the United States Navy Reserve where he became Deputy Director in the Naval Surface Warfare Center Dahlgren Division.

In the Navy Reserve, Román was an Engineering Duty Officer, then Director of Joint Capability Technology Demonstration, and Commanding Officer in naval salvage and diving operations. He participated in the recovery operations for USS John S. McCain and USS Fitzgerald following their collisions in 2017. Román commanded the Office of Naval Research (ONR) Science & Technology (S&T) 204 unit. He also serves in the Naval Sea Systems Command (NAVSEA) as the Diving, Heavy Lift, and Salvage Mentor Group Lead and has completed three tours as a Commanding Officer. Román's military service also includes participation in Operation Iraqi Freedom in 2009. In 2025 Elmer Román was appointed Assistant Secretary of the Navy for Energy, Installations and Environment.

== Public service ==
In August 2020, Román joined the Senior Executive Service (SES) as a Level II member, and was appointed Director of Mission Integration in the Office of the Under Secretary of Defense for Research and Engineering (OUSD (R&E)).

In his role as Director of Mission Integration, Román is responsible for developing mission-based inputs for the defense requirements process, enhancing the integration and experimentation of Joint Force capabilities, and guiding the development and maturation of joint warfighting concepts and operational plans.

During his tenure in Puerto Rico's public service, Román was first appointed as Secretary of the Puerto Rico Department of Public Safety in April 2019, focusing on enhancing public safety and leading disaster response initiatives. His leadership in 2019 led to an increased police presence on the streets and a 3.9% decrease in the crime rate. Following the governor's resignation, the new governor maintained Román in the cabinet, appointing him Secretary of State of Puerto Rico in May 2020.

== Diplomatic service ==
Román was from 2005 to 2010 the regional director of the Global Naval Research Office at the United States Embassy in Santiago, Chile. In this role, he served as the liaison between the United States Navy for science, technology, and maritime security, and countries in the Western Hemisphere and Africa.

== Awards ==
Román has twice received both the Navy Meritorious Civilian Service Award and the military Meritorious Service Medal. He received the Chilean Armed Forces Military Star for his efforts during the response to the 2010 category 8.8 earthquake in Chile.

He received the Rear Admiral William S. Parsons Award for Scientific and Technical Progress from the United States Navy League, the STEM Hispanic Engineer National Achievement Luminary Award, the Department of State Meritorious Honor Award, and a NASA Technical Achievement Commendation.

Political offices
Preceded by María Marcano de León; Acting	Secretary of State of Puerto Rico; 2019–2020	Succeeded by Raúl Márquez Hernández
Preceded by Brenda Johnson-Turner; Acting	United States Assistant Secretary of the Navy for Energy, Installations and Environment; Acting; July 22, 2025–December 23, 2025	Succeeded by Brendan P. Rogers
