= Puerto Rico Special Investigations Bureau =

Division of the Department of Public Safety

Agency overview
- Formed: July 13, 1978; 48 years ago
- Jurisdiction: executive branch
- Headquarters: San Juan, Puerto Rico
- Parent department: Department of Public Safety
- Key document: Law No. 38 of 1978
- Website: Negociado de Investigaciones Especiales

The Puerto Rico Special Investigations Bureau (SIB, Spanish: Negociado de Investigaciones Especiales (NIE)) is a division of the Department of Public Safety responsible for investigations relating to organized crime, prison gangs, terrorist groups, gaming and white collar crime, and fugitives. It was created by the Bureau of Special Investigations for the Commonwealth of Puerto Rico Act, Act No. 38 of 13 July 1978 of the Legislative Assembly of Puerto Rico.

== See also ==
- Office of Special Investigations
- Special Branch
