= Puerto Rico Forensic Sciences Institute =

Government agency of Puerto Rico

Puerto Rico Bureau of Forensic Science
- Negociado de Ciencias Forenses de Puerto Rico

Bureau overview
- Formed: April 10, 2017; 9 years ago
- Preceding Bureau: Puerto Rico Forensic Sciences Institute
- Dissolved: April 2017
- Jurisdiction: Puerto Rico
- Headquarters: Urb. Reparto Metropolitano, Calle Maga Esq. Calle Casia, Gobernador Piñero, San Juan, PR
- Annual budget: $14.2 million USD (2018)
- Bureau executive: María Conte Miller, MD, Director
- Key document: 20. 2017.; 13. 1985. (previous)
- Website: icf.pr.gov

The Puerto Rico Bureau of Forensic Science (Spanish: Negociado de Ciencias Forenses de Puerto Rico (NCF)) is the sole medical examiner of Puerto Rico and its municipalities. The bureau is headquartered in San Juan. The agency changed its name in April 2017 when governor Ricardo Rosselló signed into law the unification of the law enforcement and emergency service agencies of Puerto Rico into the Department of Public Safety. The agency was part of the umbrella organization for three years until Wanda Vázquez Garced signed legislation making the agency once again a separate entity.

The current director of the bureau is Doctor María Conte Miller who was appointed by governor Wanda Vazquez Garced on October 8, 2019.
