= Puerto Rico Medical Emergencies Corps =

Agency that responds to medical emergencies in Puerto Rico

Bureau of the Puerto Rico Medical Emergency Corps.
- Motto: "Our Life is to Save Lives"
- Established: 1969
- Headquarters: Rodval Building, Guaynabo, PR
- Jurisdiction: Commonwealth of Puerto Rico
- Employees: 624
- BLS or ALS: BLS/ALS
- Ambulances: 105
- Fly-cars: 30 (SUV's and Motorcycles)
- Commissioner: Jose A. Colon Grau
- Director: Abner Gomez Cortes
- Medical director: Jorge Mejia Valle
- Responses: 1,098,303 (2011)
- Website: www.cempr.pr.gov

The Bureau of the Puerto Rico Medical Emergency Corps. (Spanish: Cuerpo de Emergencias Médicas de Puerto Rico (CEMPR)), also (Negociado del Cuerpo de Emergencias Médicas) is an agency, assigned to the Puerto Rico Department of Public Safety, that responds to medical emergencies across the U.S. Commonwealth of Puerto Rico. The agency is directed by Commissioner Jose Colon Grau and Executive Director Abner Gomez Cortes.

== Operations ==
All administrative operations are conducted from its headquarters in the neighborhood of Amelia in Guaynabo. From there, tactical operations are coordinated with its six command centers located in Guaynabo, Ponce, Arecibo, Mayagüez, Caguas, Fajardo and Aguadilla, locations strategically positioned to cover the entire island.

== History ==
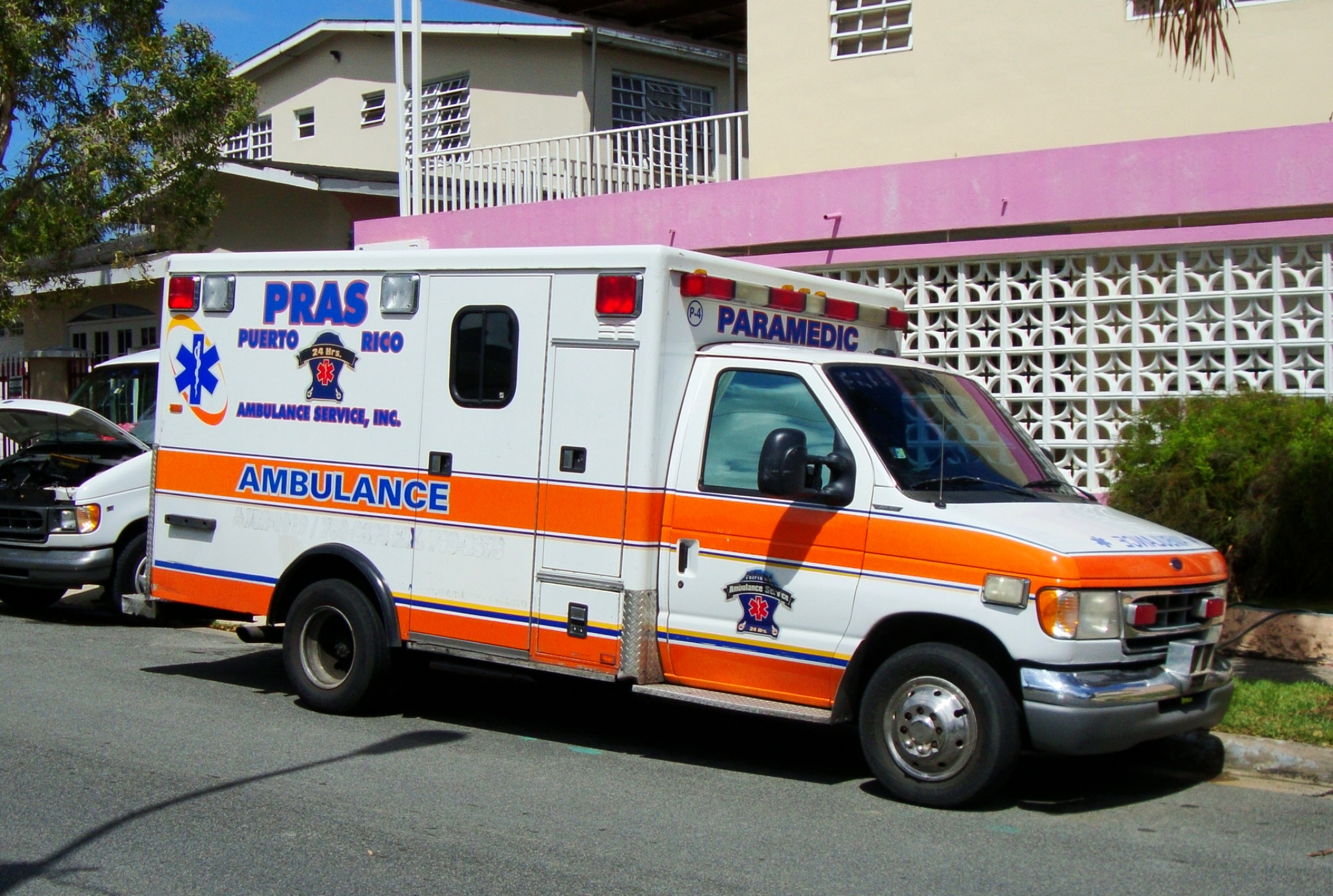
Puerto Rico Ambulance Service, Inc (PRAS) Paramedic

After 1969, ambulance services were primarily the responsibility of the municipalities, but there were a lack of ambulances, especially in mountainous areas. In 1969, Governor Luis A. Ferre created the Puerto Rico Medical Emergencies Corps, under the direct control of the Puerto Rico Department of Health. All medical emergency calls were received through the PRPD's telephone line. Then, if an ambulance was needed, the PRPD dispatched an ambulance. In 1994, the Puerto Rico 911 center was created, and all emergencies were dispatched to the police, fire and the CEMPR dispatch region of the emergency.

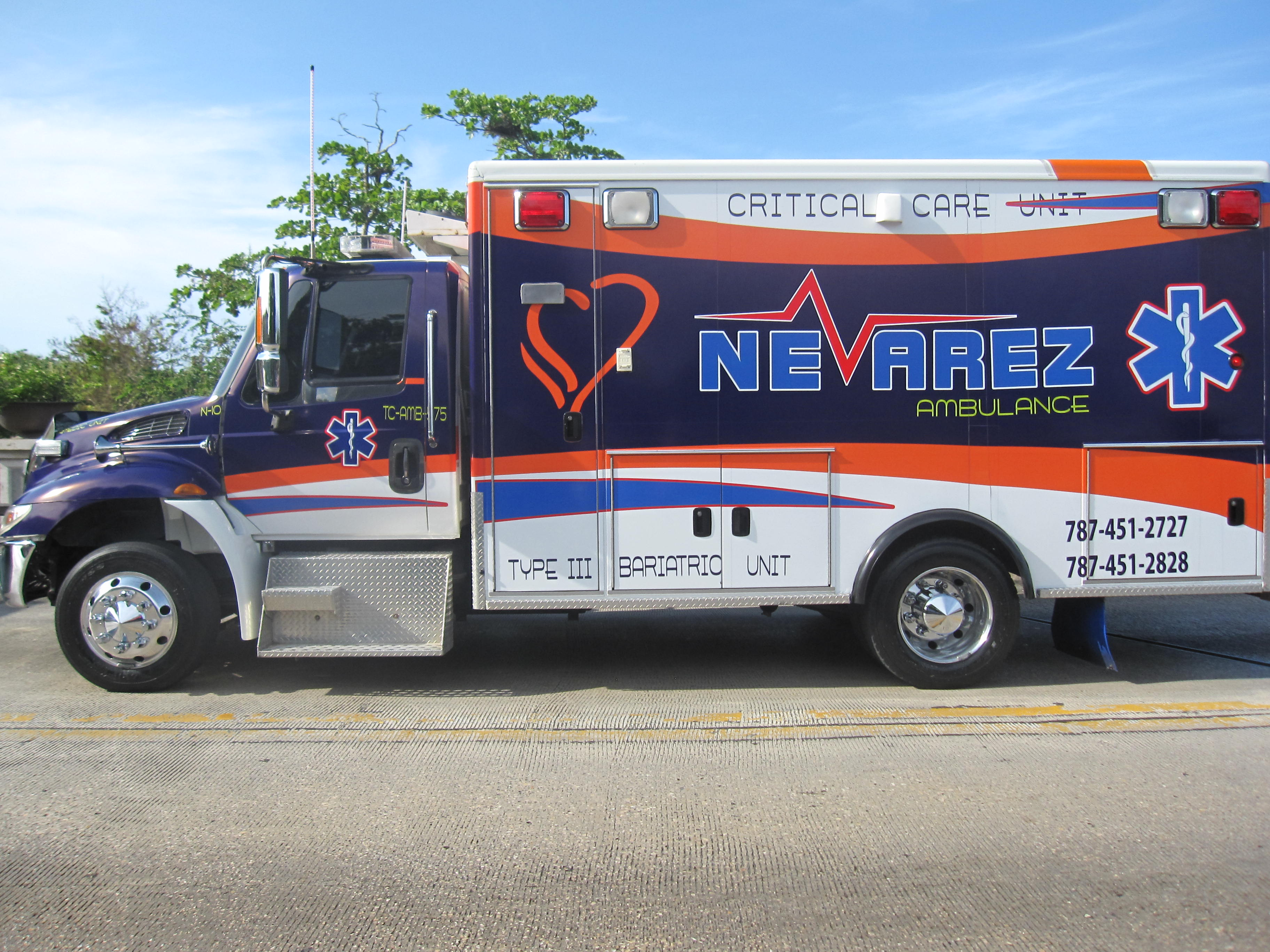
Nevarez Ambulance is private ambulance service out of Palmarejo, Corozal

In the mid-1990s, CEMPR began using the ambulances of the Municipal Offices of Emergency Management of San Juan, Guaynabo and Bayamon. They were joined later by Ponce, Carolina, Cayey, Arroyo, Mayagüez, and others. Then, in 2008, private ambulances were added to the system to reduce backlogs in the system.

Also, since the late 1990s groups of rescue volunteers have proliferated in Puerto Rico, especially in the San Juan Metro Area, specifically the municipalities of San Juan, Bayamon, Guaynabo, Trujillo Alto, Carolina, Loiza, Canovanas, Cataño, Toa Baja, Toa Alta, Dorado and Caguas. Their primary mission is to assist the already overburdened emergency medical system in the evening, when cases are duplicated by accident, case reports and critical cases. In 2009, CEMPR began using Puerto Rico Fire Corps stations to place their EMT posts to better served the community. Now CEMPR, along with the Puerto Rico Fire Corps, serves mountain towns where ambulance services tended to be late due to their remoteness.

The motto for the Puerto Rico Medical Emergencies Corps is "Nuestra Vida es Salvar Vidas" ("Our Life is to Save Lives").

CEMPR (Negociado del Cuerpo de Emergencias Médicas) worked in conjunction with the Department of Health and the Hospital Coalition to update its operational plans to ensure readiness to respond to hurricanes.

In April 2017, governor Ricardo Rosselló signed into law the creation of the Puerto Rico Department of Public Safety which unified, under an umbrella organization, all government agencies responsible for law enforcement and emergency response in Puerto Rico. All agencies became bureaus of the department.

In 2019, Governor Wanda Vázquez Garced restored the 30 days of vacation for the employees of the bureau, which had been reduced to 15 days per year by the previous governor, Ricardo Rosselló.

In 2019 the bureau had 624 employees, but with a total of only 570 paramedics, the lowest in its history. Many believed this was due to austerity cuts. The average ambulance response time is 20 minutes, double the amount of time if the bureau were able to follow best practices.

== See also ==
- Economy of Puerto Rico
- Crime in Puerto Rico
- PROMESA
