= List of people from Ponce, Puerto Rico =

This is a list of notable Ponceños, people from Ponce, Puerto Rico. Listed here are people who were either born in Ponce or who were not born in Ponce, but who are or were longtime residents of the city – the so-called adopted sons and daughters of Ponce, and known in Spanish as "Ponceñistas". Ponce has also been the birthplace and the place of residence of many Puerto Ricans who became notable elsewhere. The following lists many of them as well. The list is arranged alphabetically by area of notability.

== List of notable Ponceños by area of notability ==
The list is divided into categories and in some cases sub-categories which best describe the field for which the subject is most noted. For individuals notable in more than one field (such as "Luis A. Ferré" who is notable as a former "governor" and as an "industrialist") the entry is made under the field for which the individual is most noted.

Contents: Top – Actors, actresses, comedians and directors, Architects, Authors, playwrights and poets, Beauty queens and fashion models, Business people and industrialists, Civil rights and/or political activists, Clergy, Composers, contemporary singers, musicians and opera, Criminals and outlaws, Diplomats, Educators, Governors, Historians, Journalists, Judges, law enforcement and firefighters, Military, Physicians, scientists and inventors, Politicians, Sportspeople, Visual Artists.

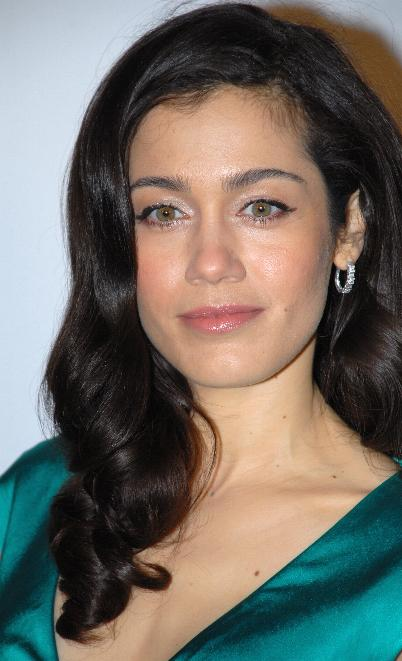
Lymari Nadal, actress American Gangster

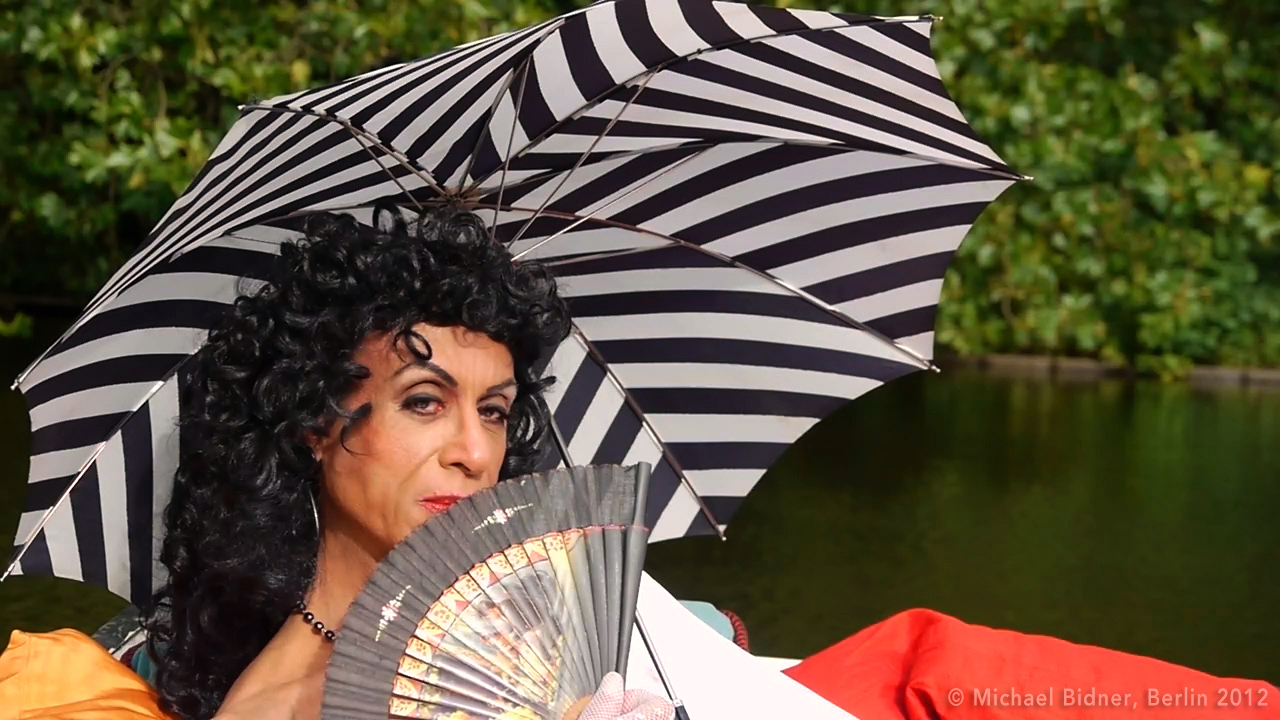
Mario Montez, a Warhol superstar

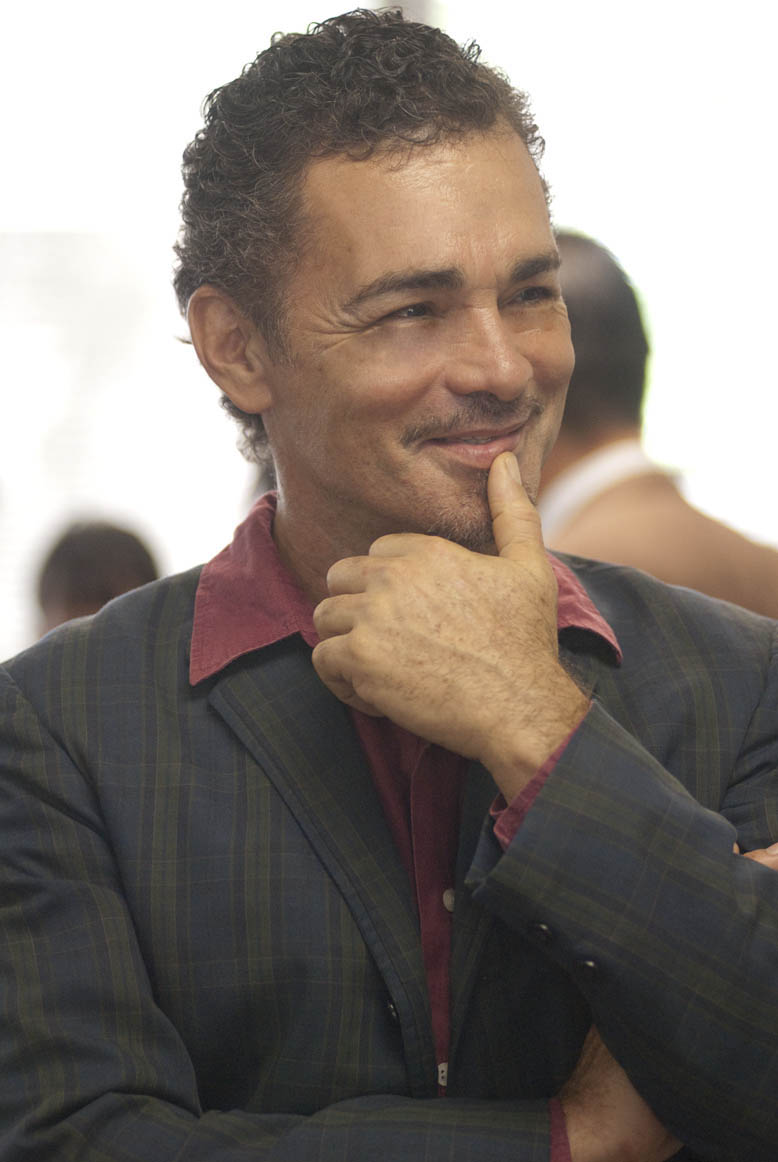
Big screen actor Teófilo Torres

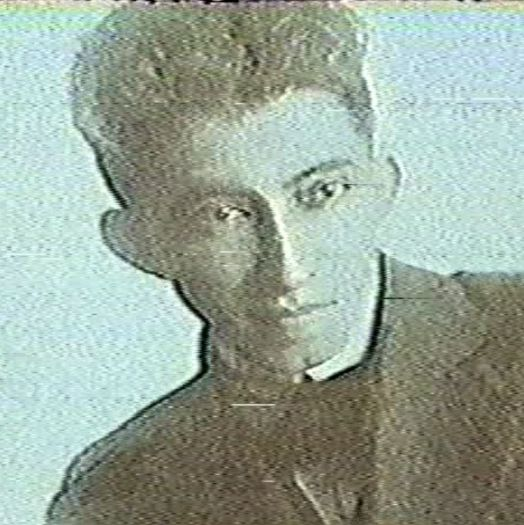
Film producer Juan Emilio Viguié

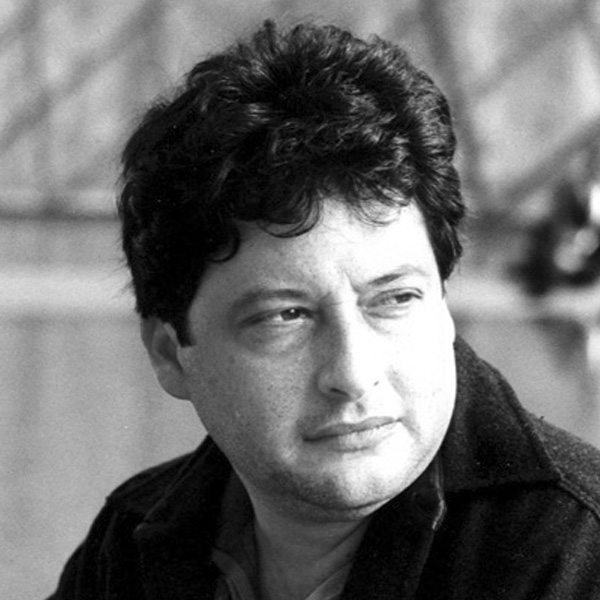
Andrés Mignucci, FAIA 2012 Henry Klumb Awardee

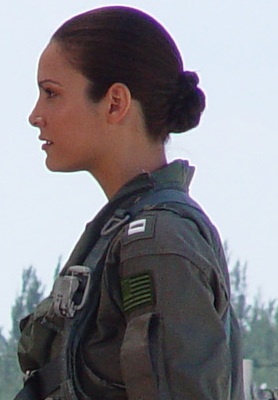
Denise Quiñones, Miss Universe 2001

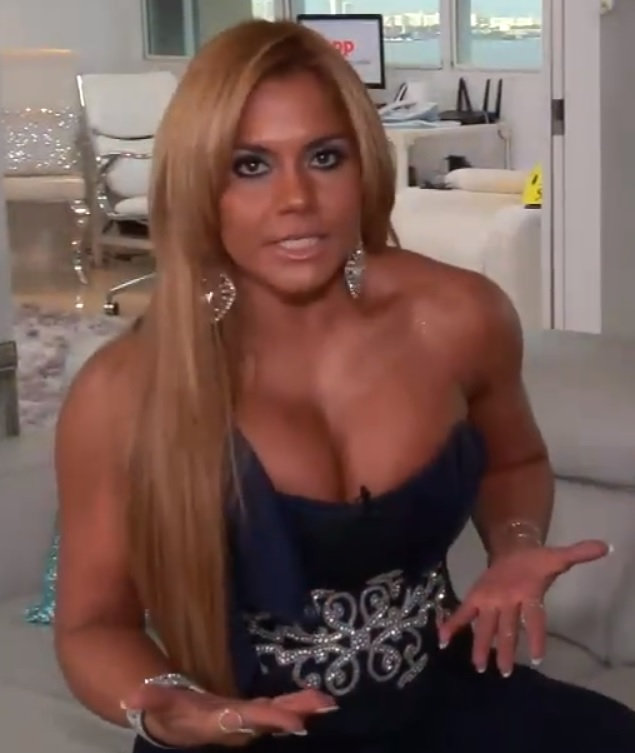
Maripily Rivera, actress and model

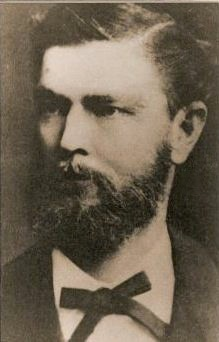
Juan Serrallés, founder of Destilería Serrallés, makers of Don Q rum

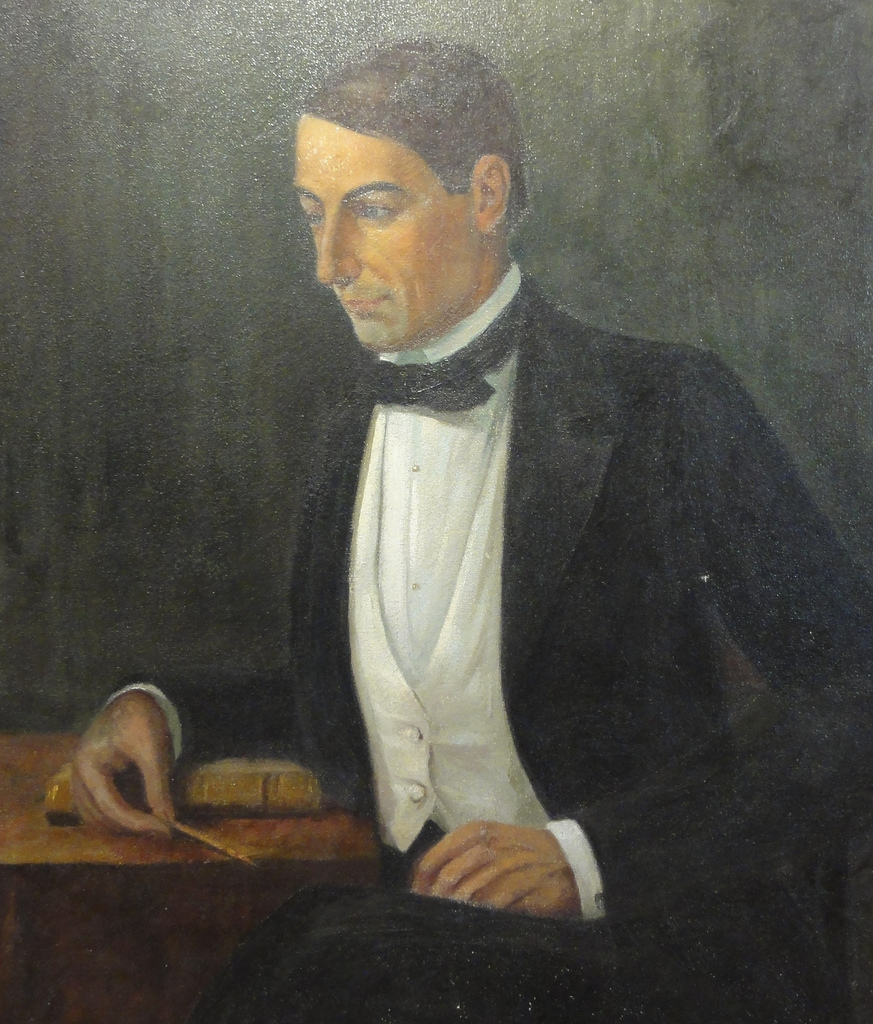
Valentín Tricoche, philanthropist

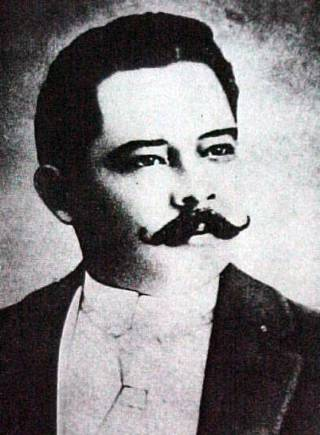
Juan Morel Campos, Composer of Danzas

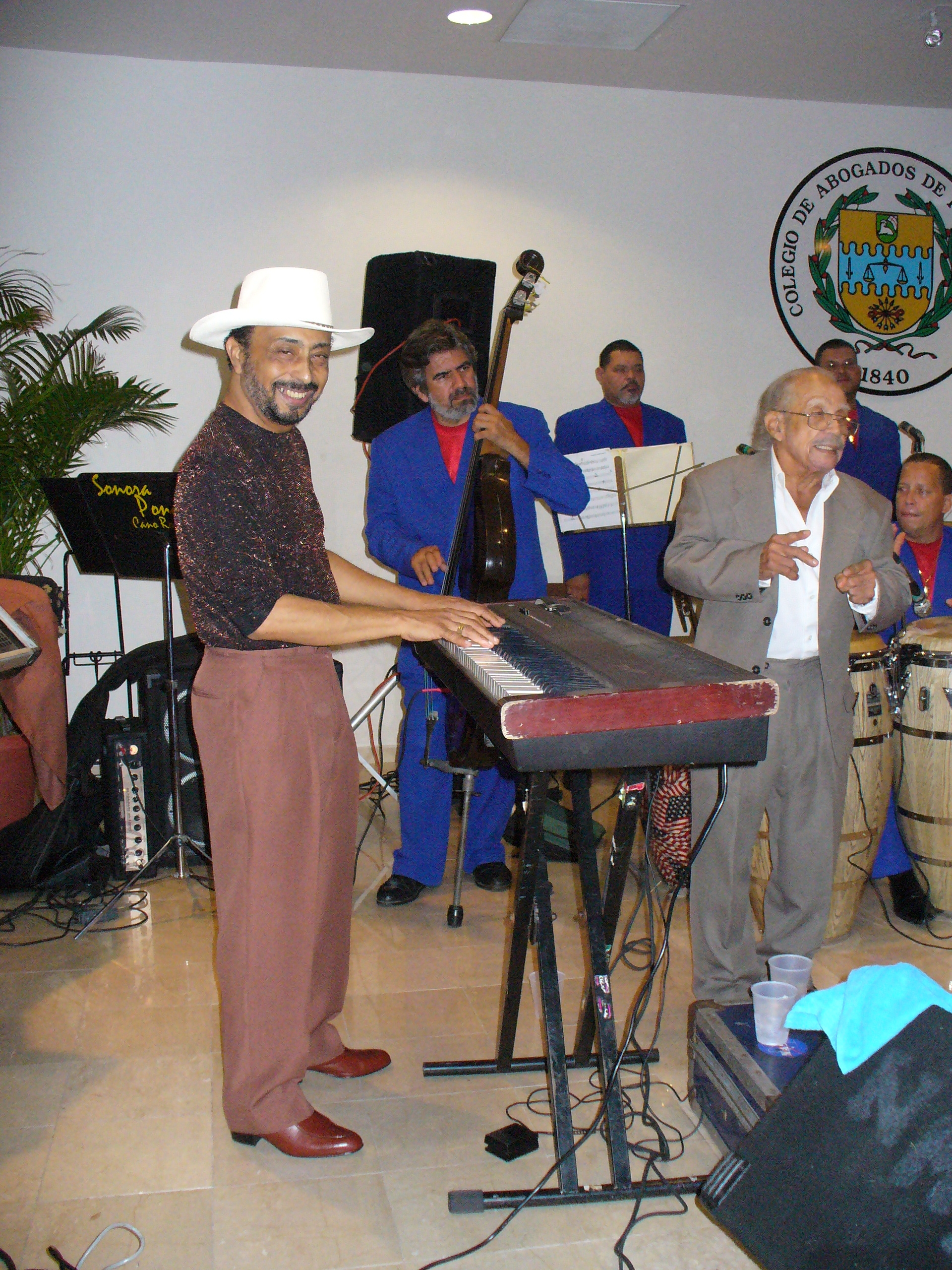
Multi-instrumentalist Papo Lucca at piano

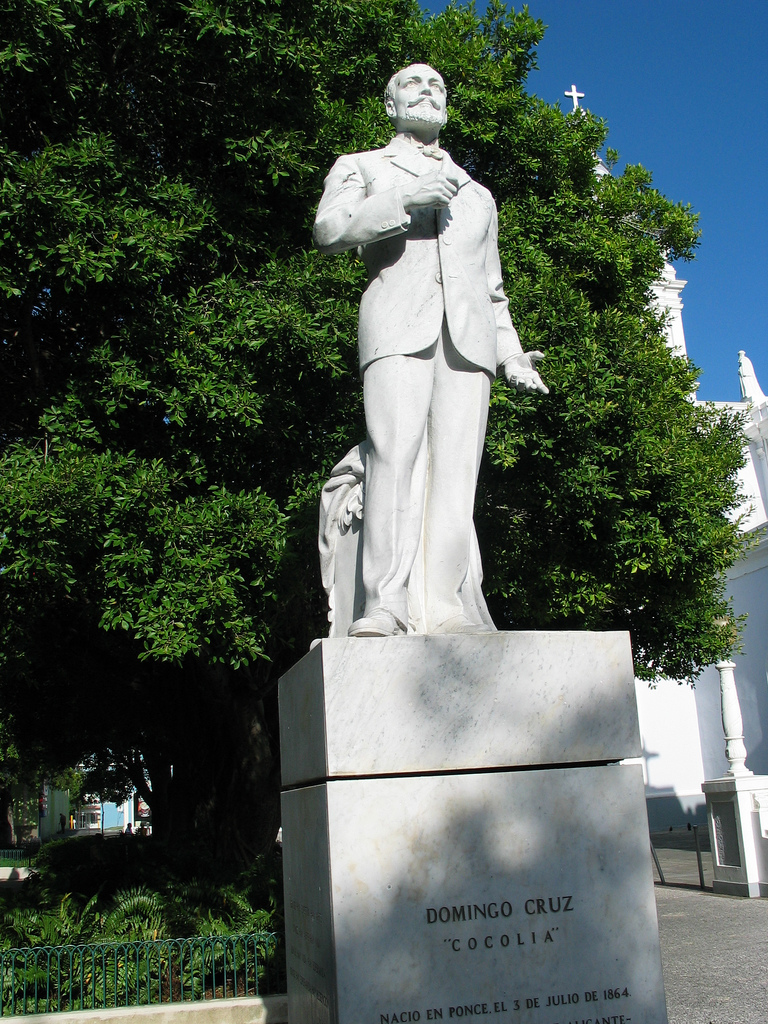
Domingo Cruz "Cocolía", Ponce Municipal Band director

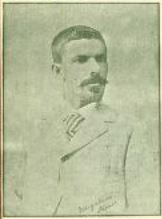
Juan Ríos Ovalle, danza composer and orchestra conductor

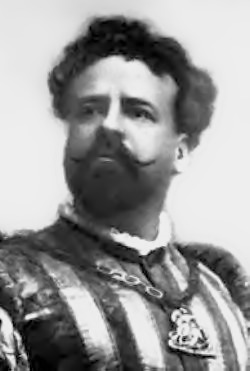
Antonio Paoli, Tenor

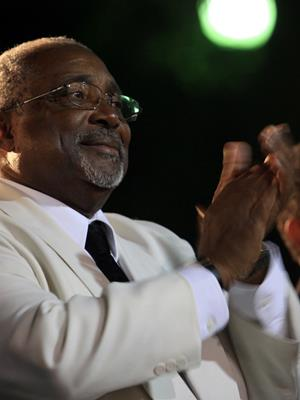
Rubén Colón Tarrats in 2012

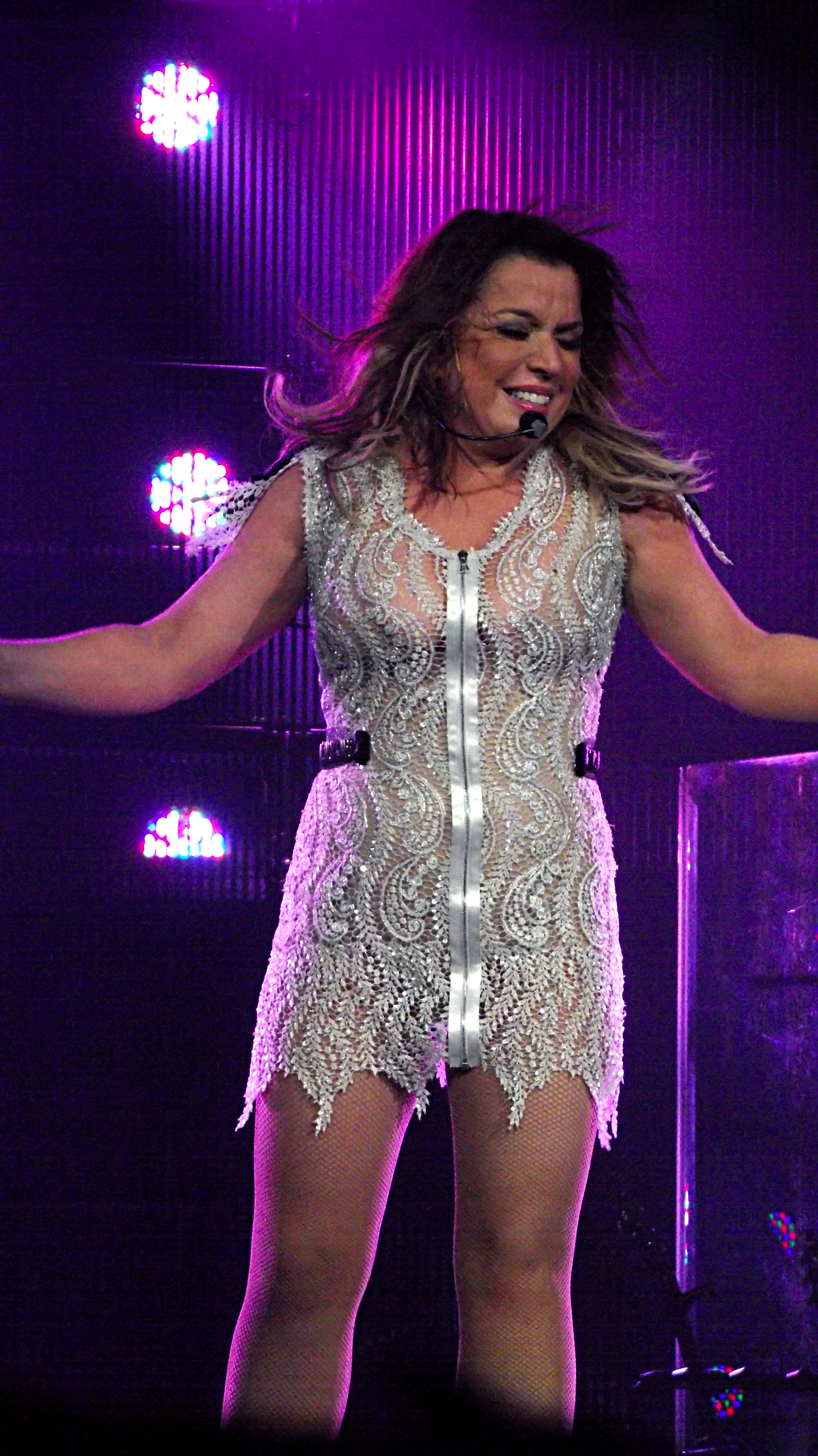
Ednita Nazario, pop music singer

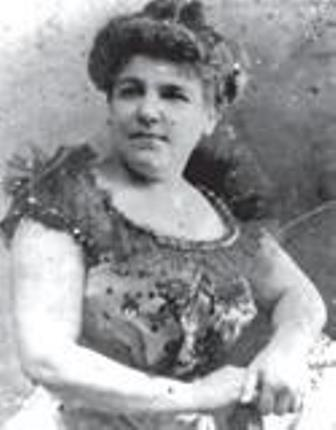
Amalia Paoli, soprano

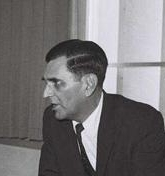
Roberto Sánchez Vilella, Governor of Puerto Rico (1965-1969)

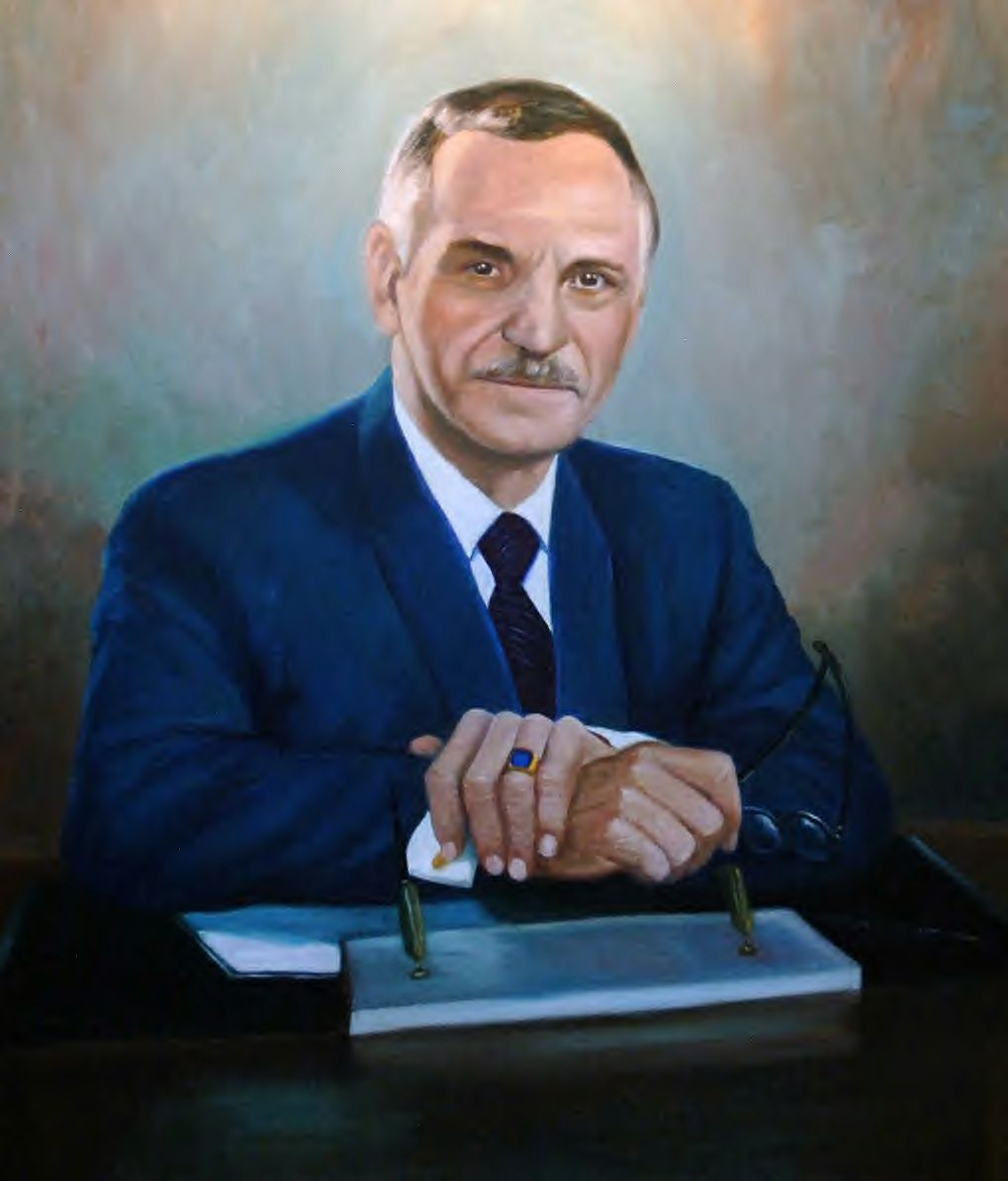
Luis A. Ferré, governor, philanthropist and industrialist

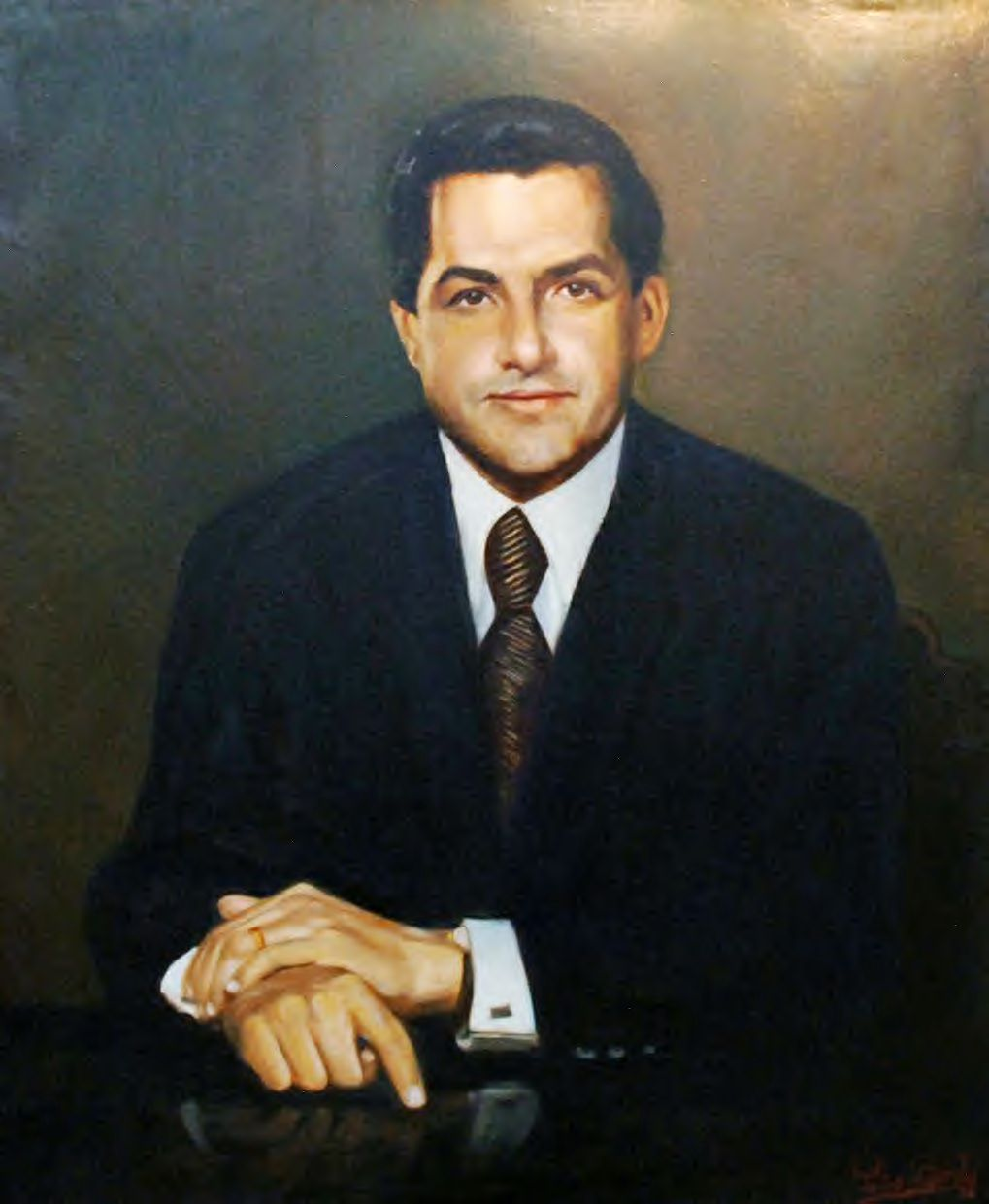
Rafael Hernández Colón Governor of Puerto Rico (1973-77, 1985-93)

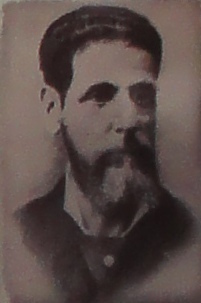
Ramón Marín, historian

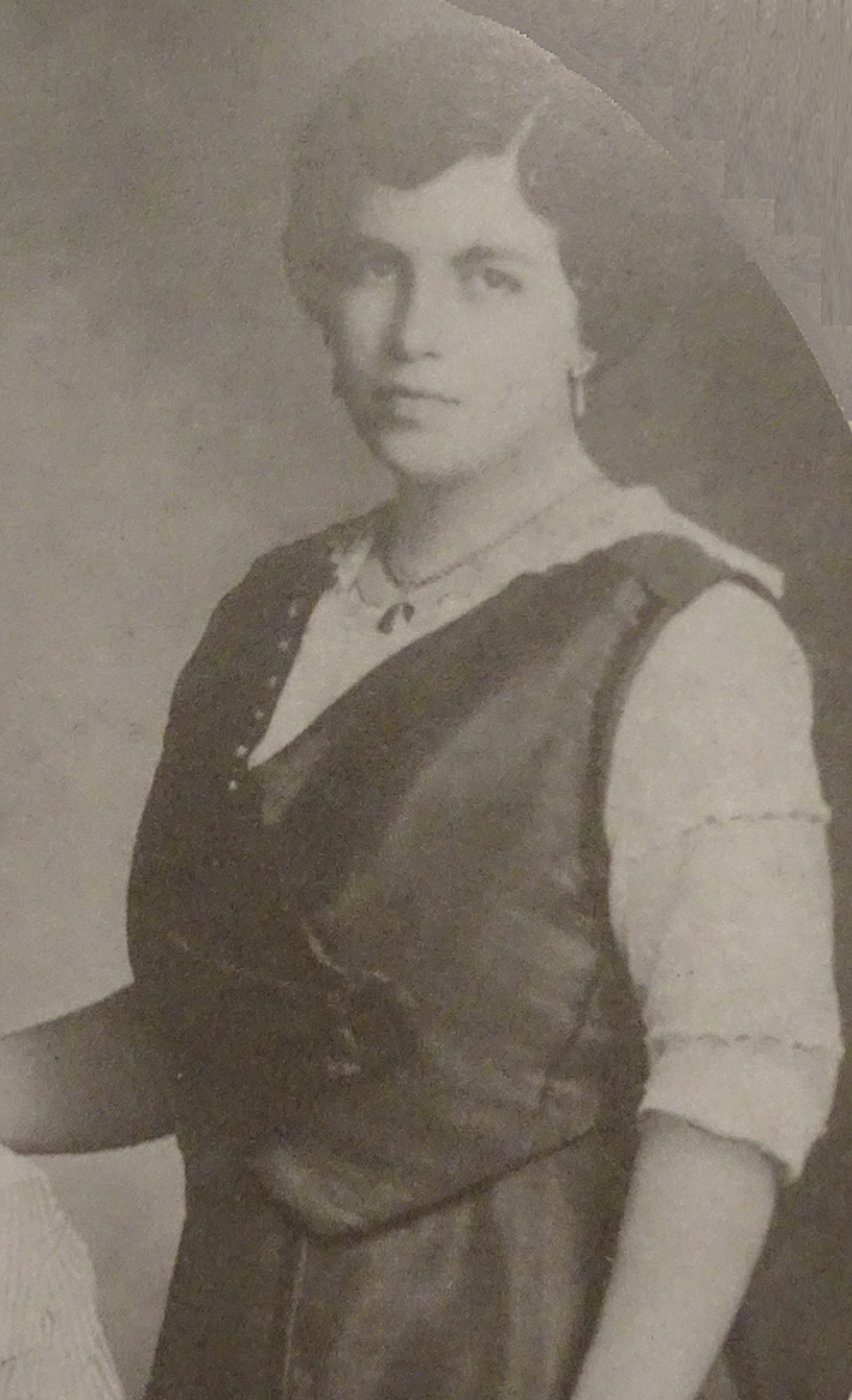
Lolita Tizol, music educator

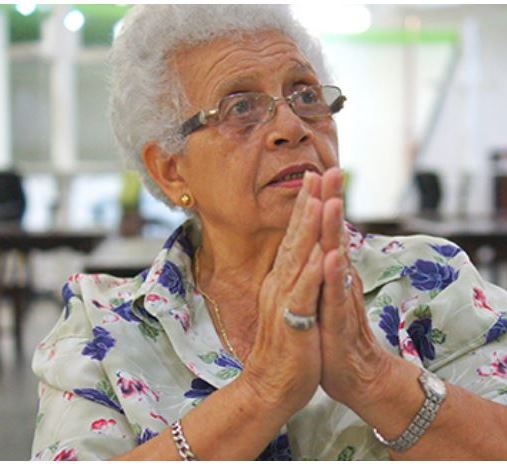
Gladys Tormes González, historian

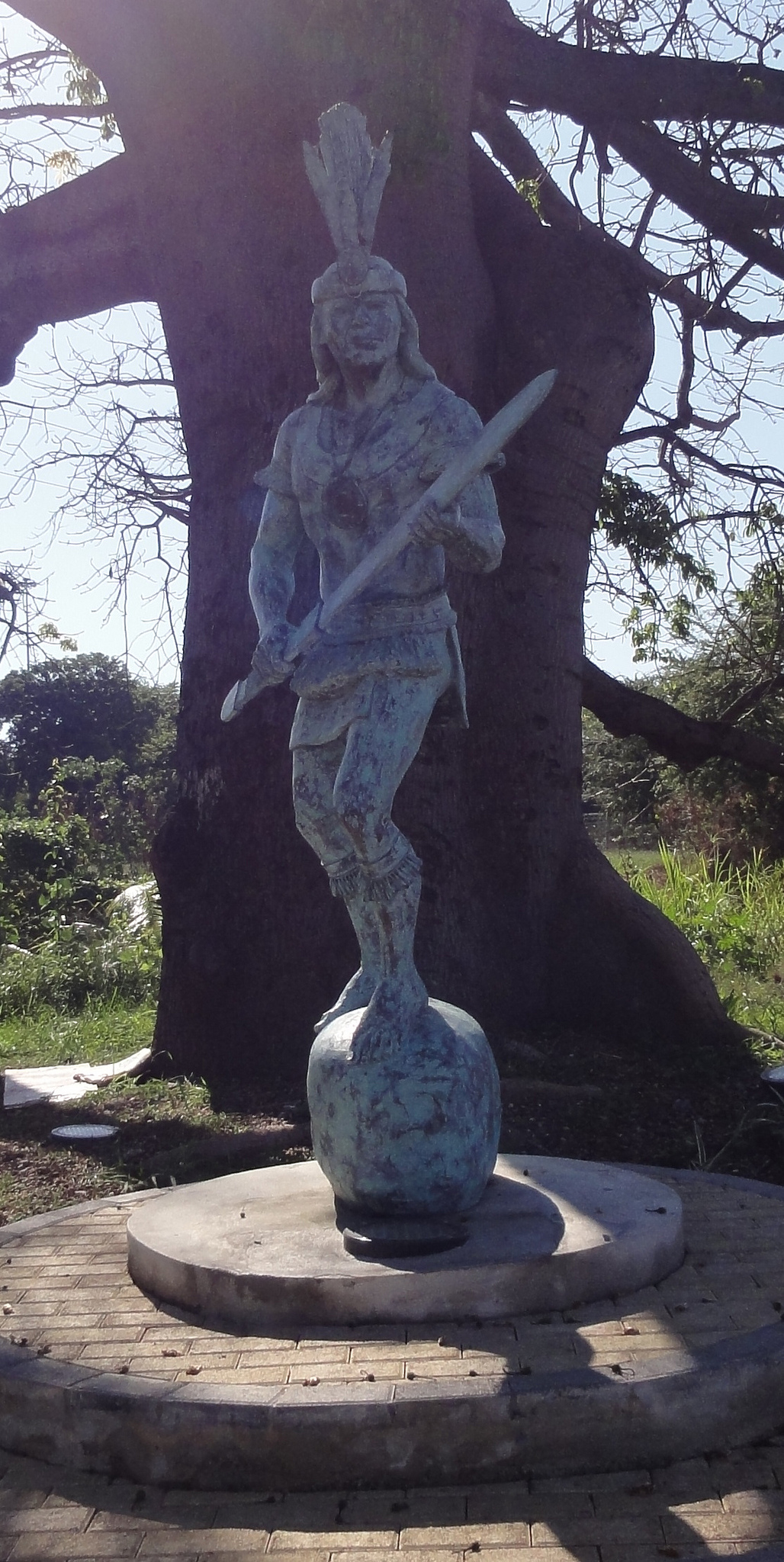
Agüeybaná II, leader of the Taíno rebellion of 1511

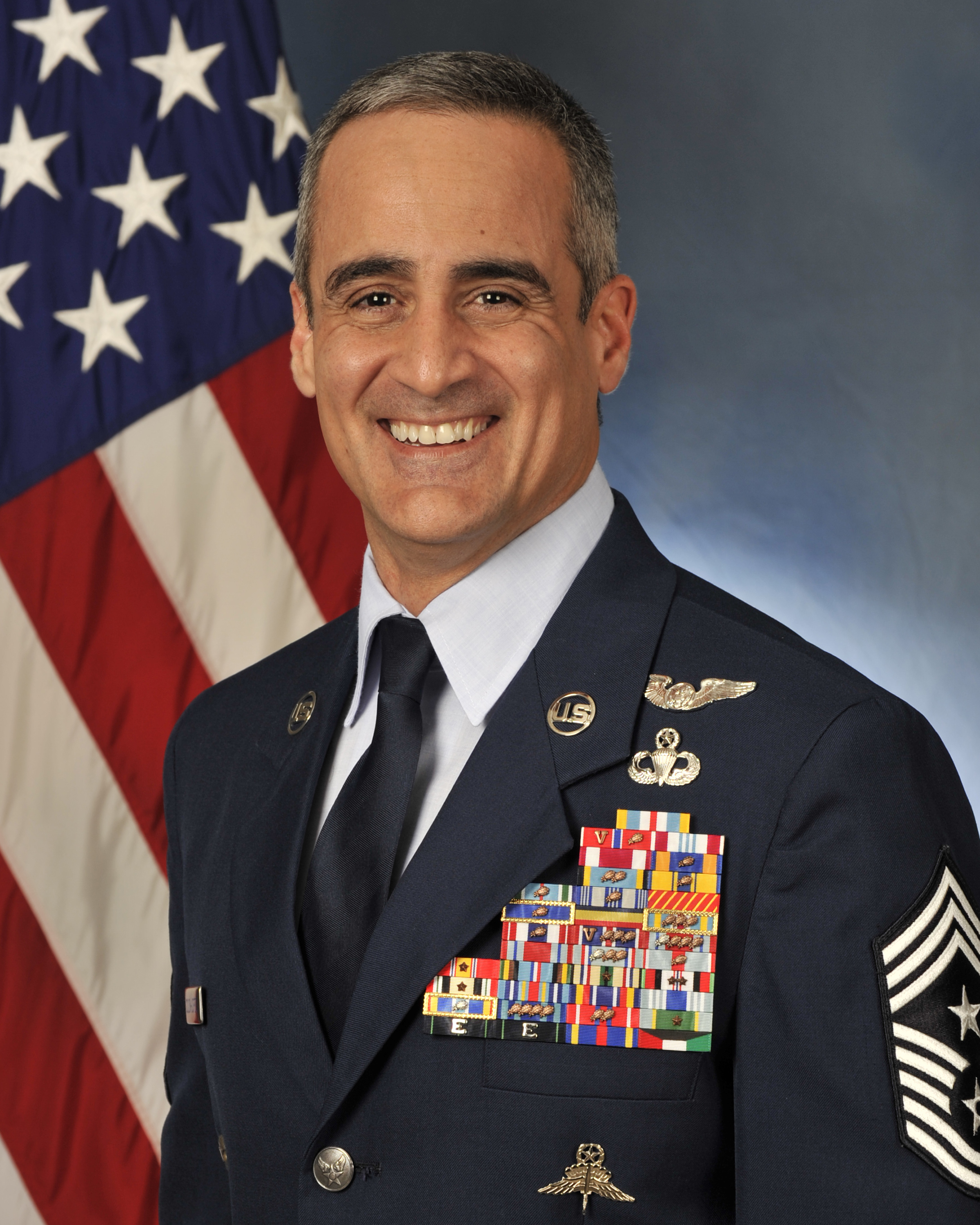
Chief Master Sergeant Ramón Colón-López

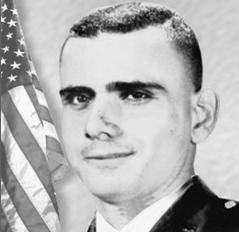
Euripides Rubio, Medal of Honor recipient

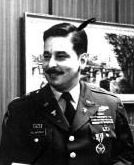
Colonel Raúl G. Villaronga, military and Mayor of Killeen, Texas

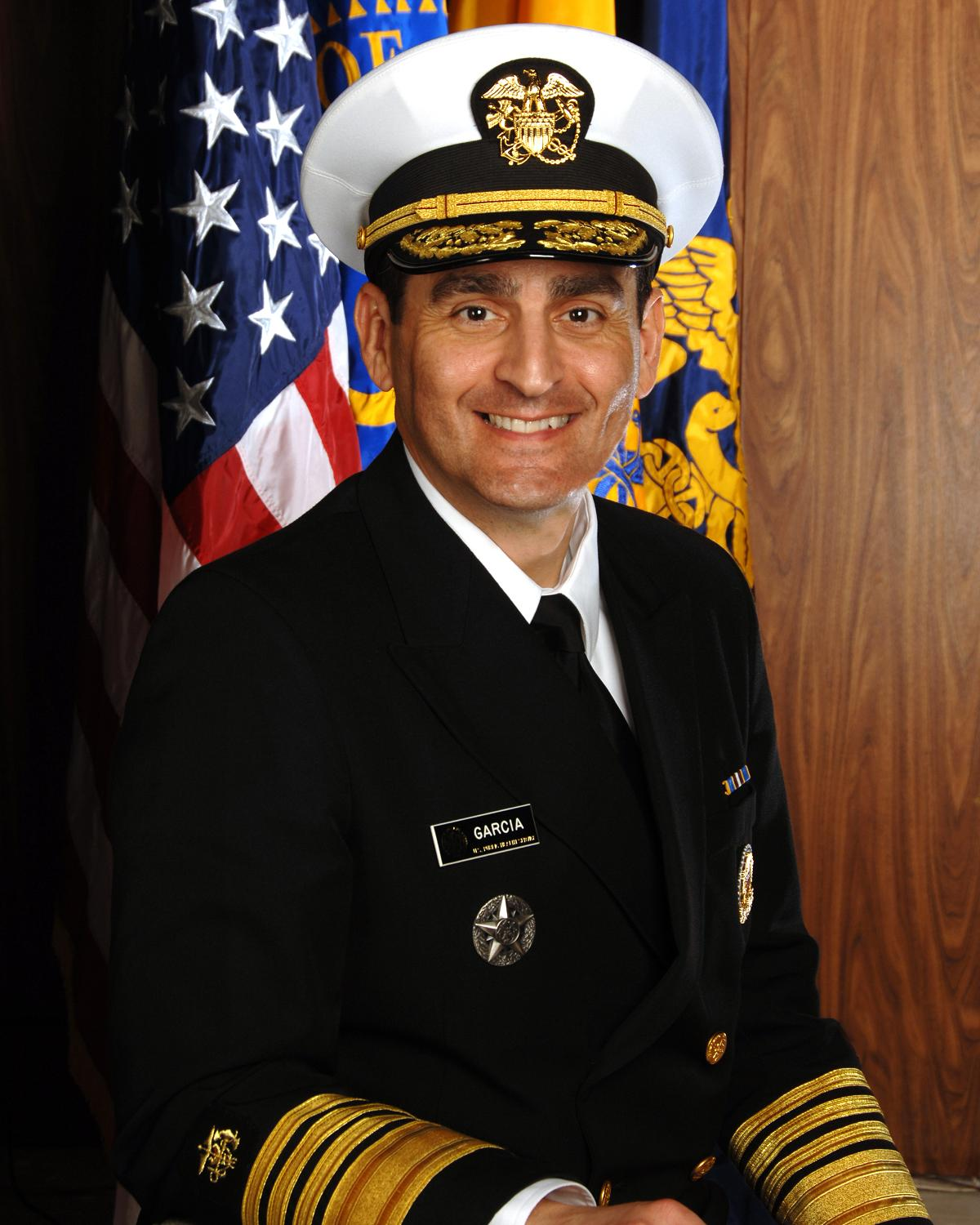
Joxel García, Assistant Secretary of Health under President George W. Bush

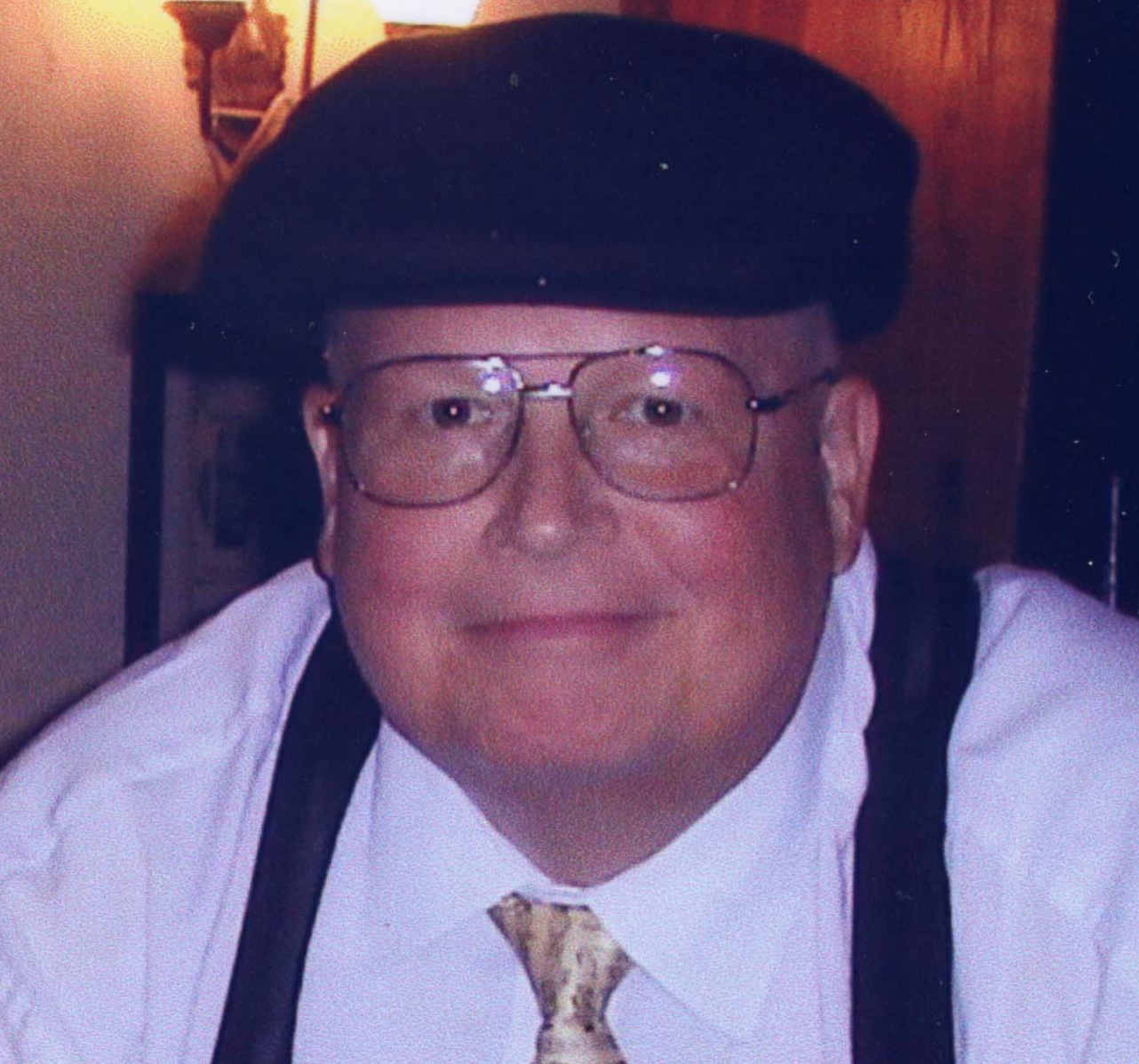
Gerónimo Lluberas, physician and humanitarian

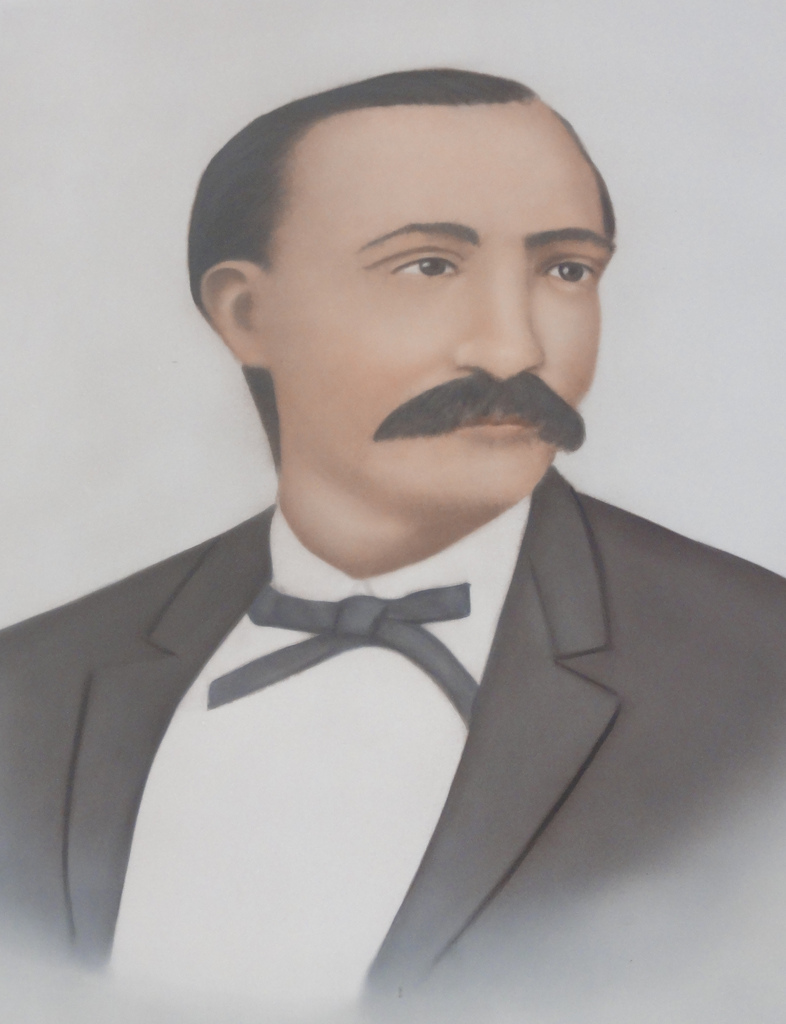
Dr. Rafael Pujals, physician and civic leader

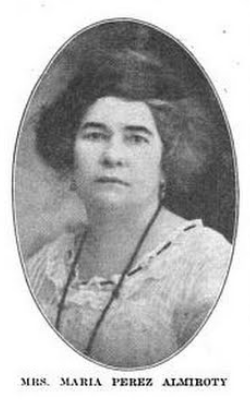
María Martínez Acosta, politician

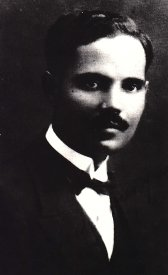
Pedro Albizu Campos – President and principal leader of the Puerto Rican Nationalist Party.

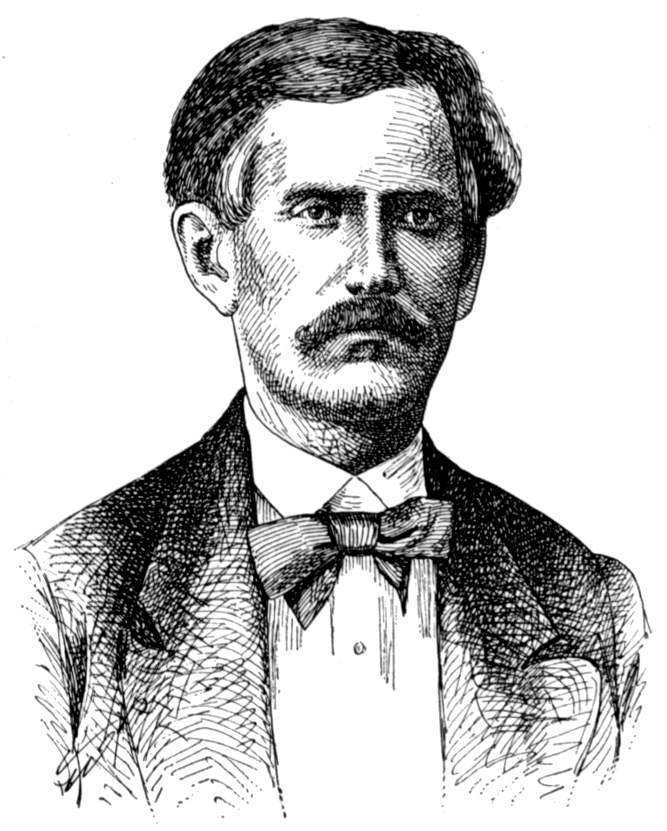
Román Baldorioty de Castro, The Father of Puerto Rico's Autonomy

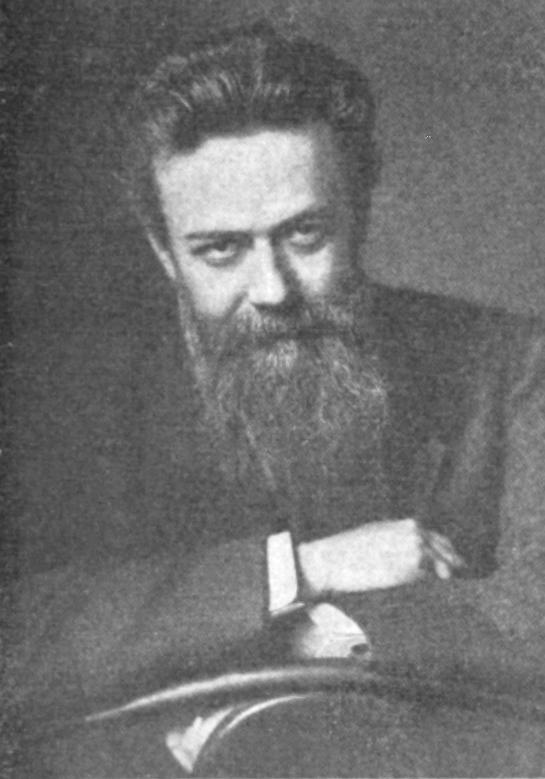
Federico Degetau, writer, author, and Resident Commissioner

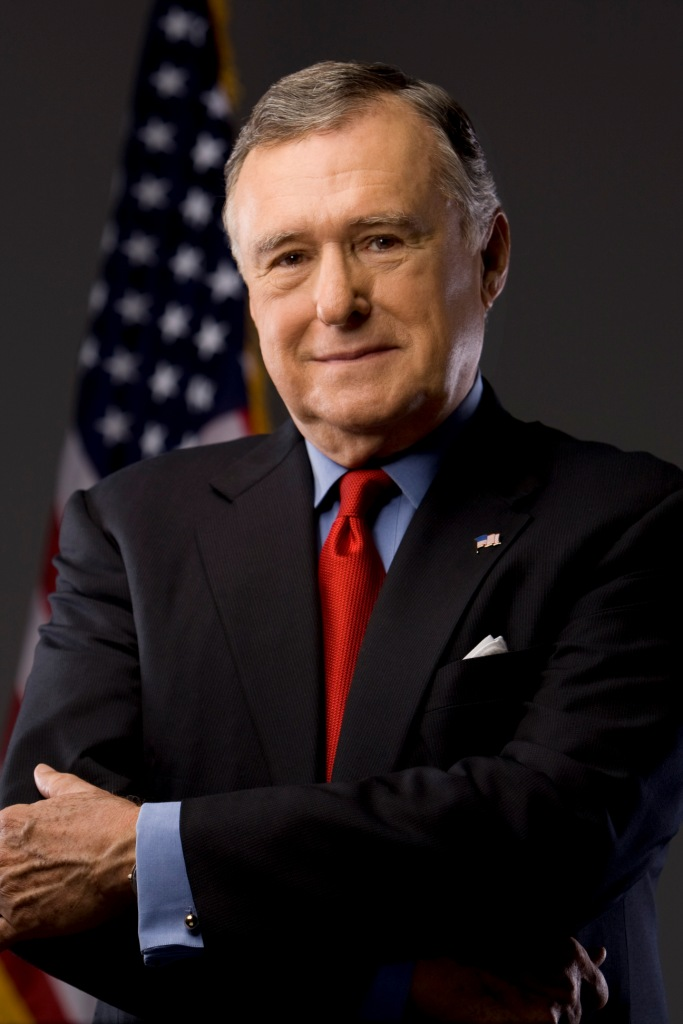
Maurice Ferré, former Mayor of Miami

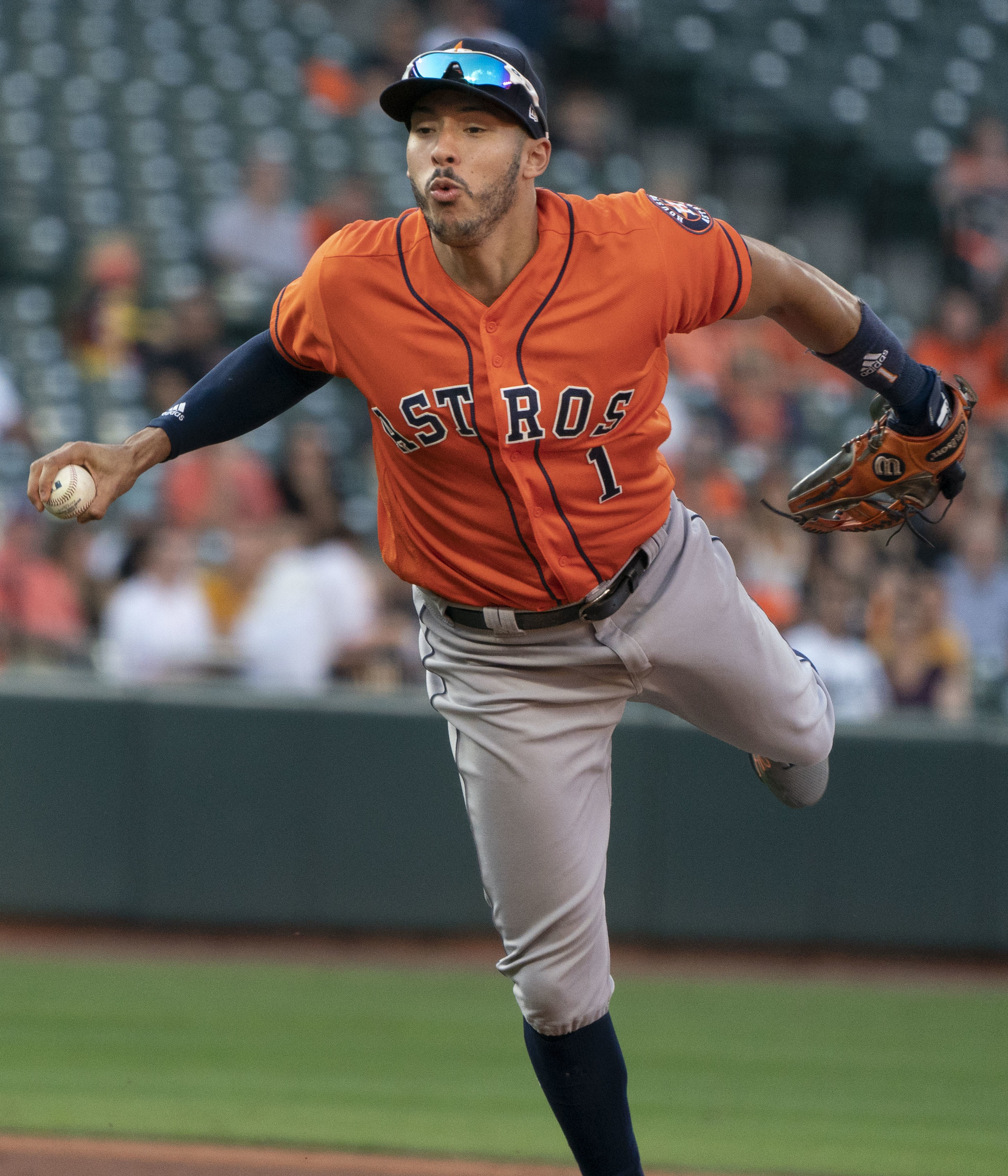
Carlos Correa, MLB player with the Houston Astros

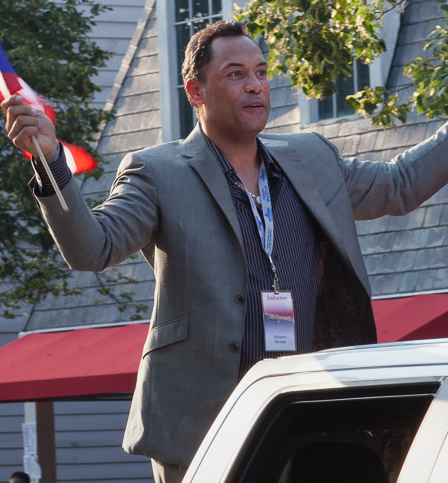
Roberto Alomar, MLB Hall of Famer

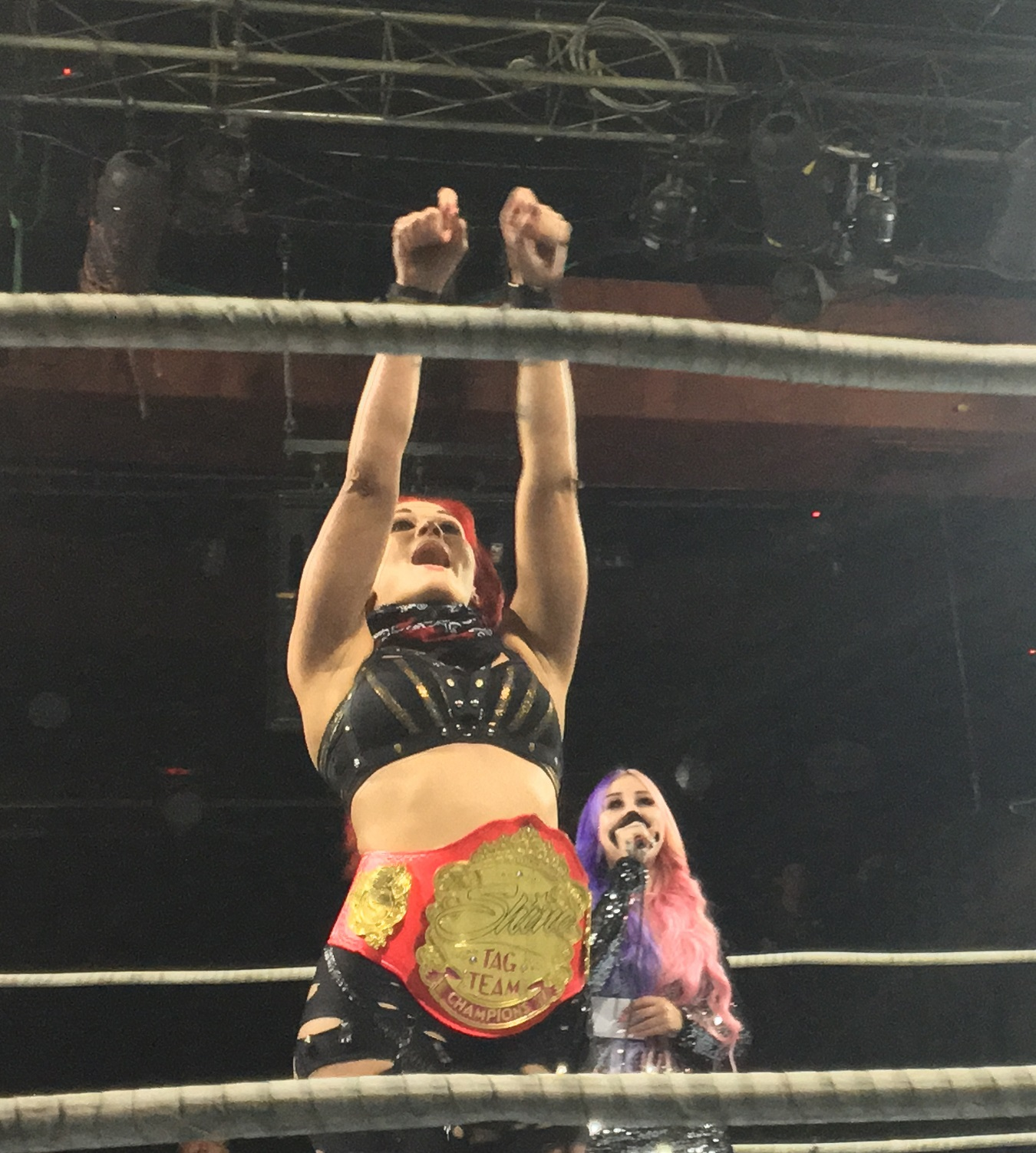
Ivelisse Vélez, professional wrestler

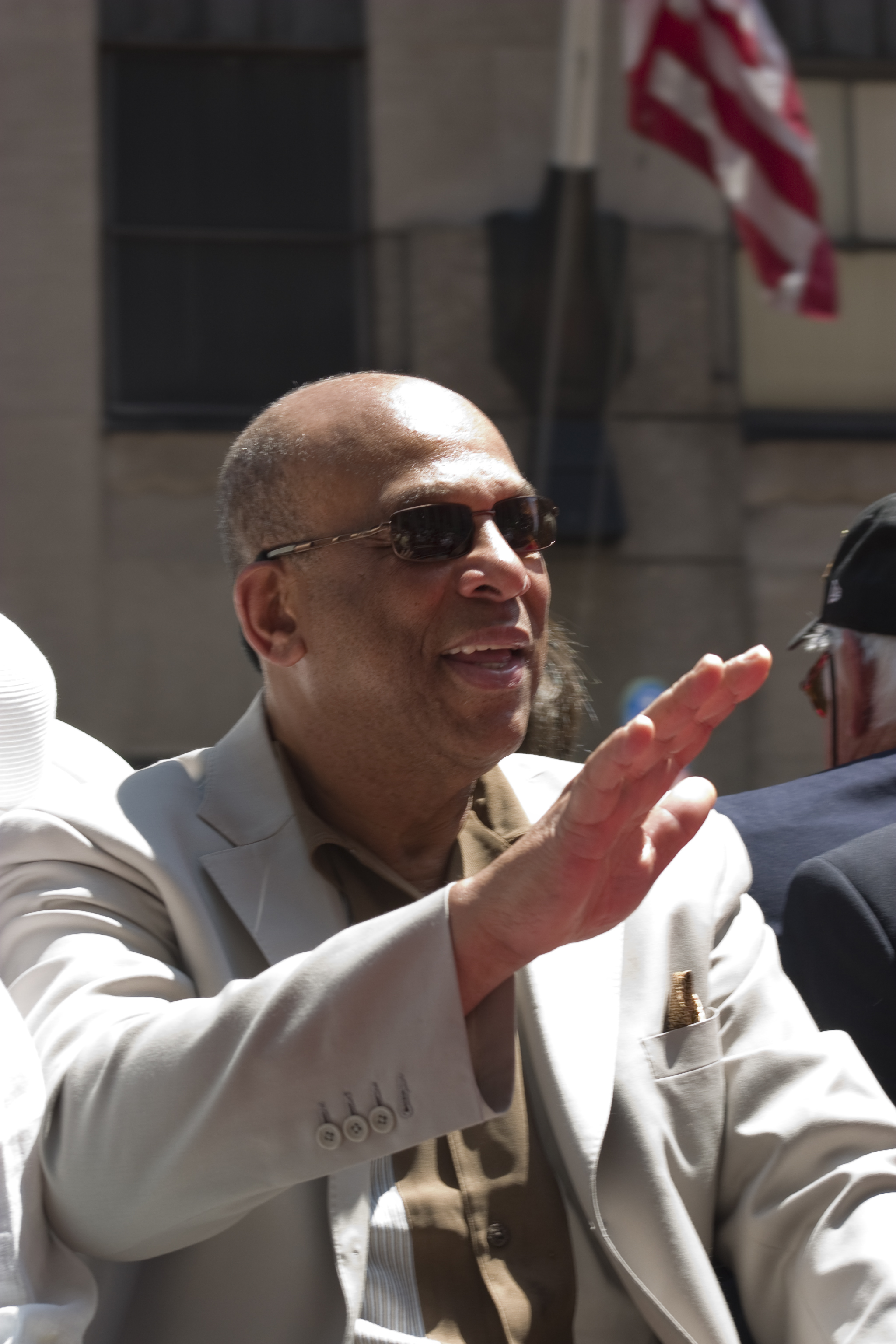
Orlando Cepeda, MLB Hall of Famer

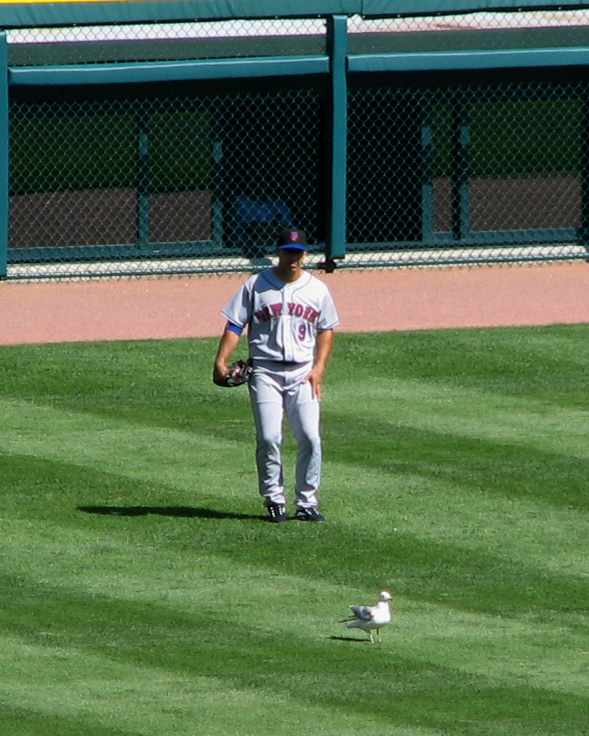
Ricky Ledée with the Mets

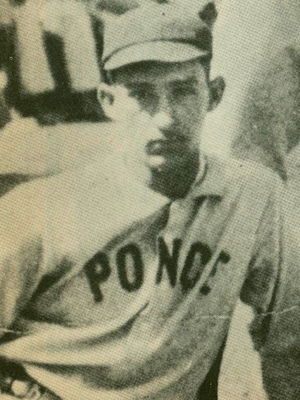
Francisco "Paquito" Montaner around 1912

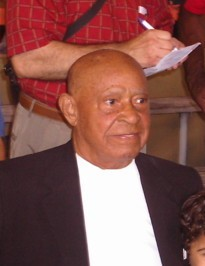
Millito Navarro, last surviving player of the American Negro League

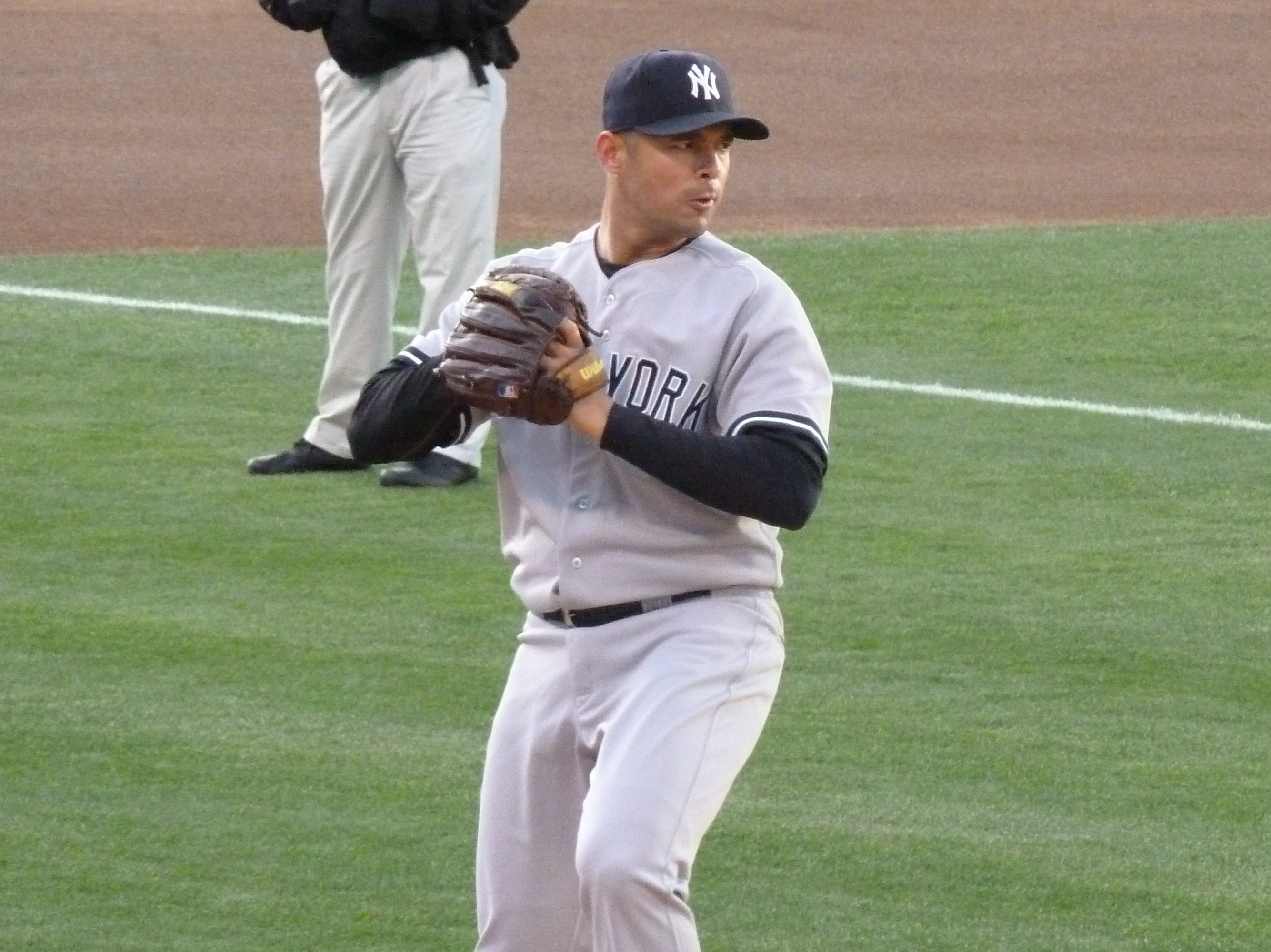
Javier Vázquez with the Yankees

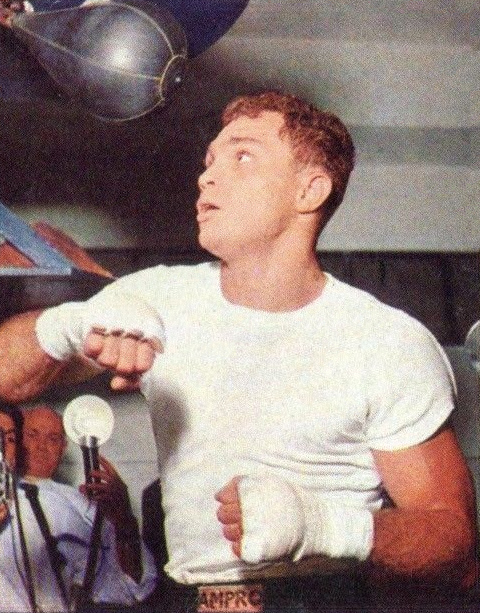
Carlos Ortíz, 3-time world boxing champion

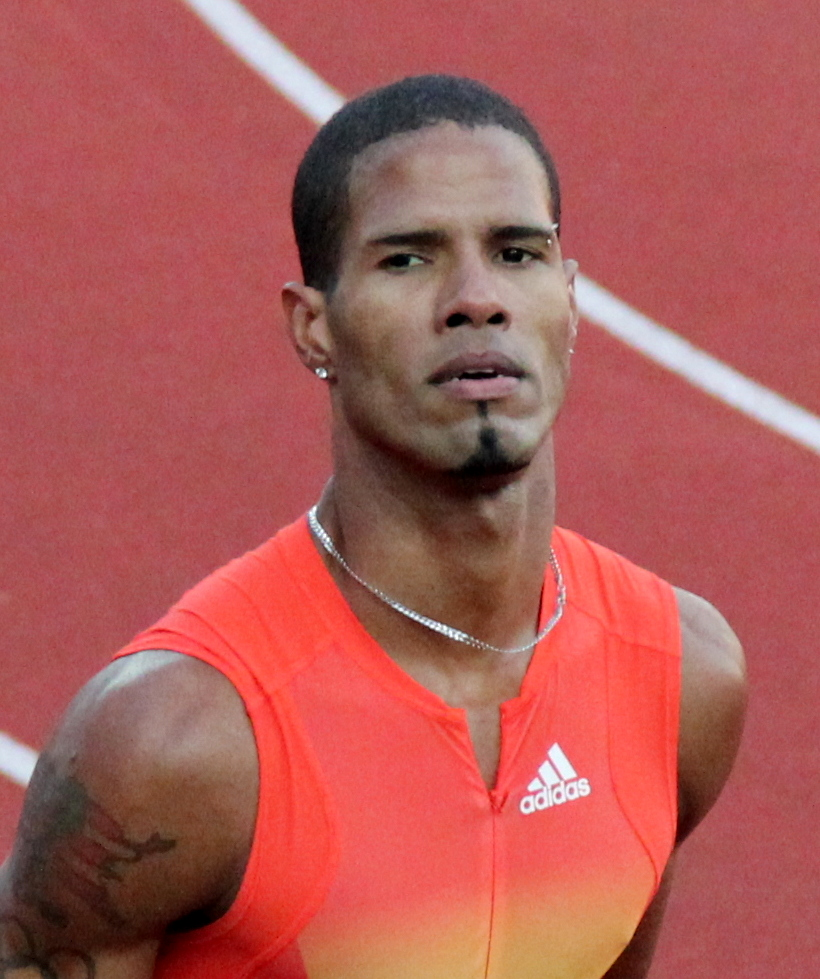
Javier Culson, 400-meter hurdles

=== Actors, actresses, comedians, directors and entertainers ===
- Marisol Calero, actress
  Films: Under Suspicion, and "El último de los amantes" (the Spanish language version of The Last of the Red Hot Lovers).
- Míriam Colón, actress
  Founder of New York City's Puerto Rican Traveling Theatre
- María-Elena Laas, actress
  Films: The Hot Chick, and Suffering Man's Charity, among others.
- Walter Mercado, astrologer, dancer, telenovela actor, writer
- Mario Montez, female impersonator/actor
  A Warhol superstar.
- Tommy Muñiz, television producer comedian and actor
  Pioneer in Puerto Rico television. Starred in the movie "Lo que le Pasó a Santiago", directed by Jacobo Morales, which was nominated for an Academy Award for Best Foreign Language Film.
- Lymari Nadal, actress
  Film: American Gangster; TV: Battlestar Galactica
- Elín Ortíz, actor, producer, comedian and screenwriter.
  For many years interpreted "Relíquia", mocking political corruption in Puerto Rico.
- Jeimy Osorio, actress.
  Film: Una Maid en Manhattan, "Porque el amor manda", "Santa Diabla"; TV: Celia.
- Gilluis Pérez, actor.
  TV: Nicky Jam: El Ganador.
- Luis Raúl, actor, comedian and TV host
  Acted in many telenovelas. Hosted "Anda Pa'l Cara" and "Pa' Que Te Lo Goces"
- Esther Sandoval, actress.
  Starred in "Ante La Ley", Puerto Rico's first telenovela.
- Marta Romero, actress and singer
  One of the pioneers of telenovelas in Puerto Rico
- Teófilo Torres, actor and film director
  Film: "Dios los cría", the Spanish language version of ...And God Created Them, among others.
- Carmen Nydia Velázquez, comedian and singer
  Fictional role in the comedic duet "Susa y Epifanio"
- Rosita Velázquez, actress, comedian and singer, grew up in Ponce.
- Juan Emilio Viguié, film producer
  Pioneer film producer. Made the first commercially successful films in the island, including "Romance Tropical", the first Puerto Rican film with sound.
- Marco Zunino, actor
  Starred in the musicals Jesucristo Superstar, Cabaret, Rent and Amor sin barreras (West Side Story).

=== Architects ===
- Pedro Adolfo de Castro y Besosa, architect
  A graduate of an American architecture university, he designed masterpieces such as Castillo Serrallés and Casa de España.
- Juan Bertoli Calderoni, architect
  Designer of Teatro La Perla
- Maruja Fuentes, industrial and environmental designer
- Timoteo Luberza, architect
  Designed Plaza del Mercado Isabel II
- Andrés Mignucci, urbanist.
  Fellow of the American Institute of Architects. Winner of the Henry Klumb Award 2012.
- Francisco Porrata-Doría, architect
  Designed the Ponce Cathedral, Banco de Ponce building, and Banco Crédito y Ahorro Ponceño building.
- Blas Silva, architect
  Creator of the Ponce Creole architectural style. Designed the Casa de la Masacre, Font-Ubides House, and the Subira House, among others.
- Alfredo Wiechers Pieretti, architect
  Designed many buildings now in the NRHP including Casa Wiechers-Villaronga, today the Museo de la Arquitectura Ponceña.

=== Authors, playwrights and poets ===
- César Andreu Iglesias, labor organizer, journalist, novelist, and short-story writer.
  Co-founder of Claridad. President of the Puerto Rican Communist Party, and recipient of the 1960 Award for Excellence in Journalism from the Puerto Rican Institute of Literature.
- Rosario Ferré, fiction writer, poet, essayist and biographer
  Award: Liberatur Prix Award, Frankfurt Book Fair.
- Félix Franco-Oppenheimer, poet and writer
  His works include "Contornos", "Imagen y visión edénica de Puerto Rico", and "Antología poética".
- Pedro J. Labarthe, poet, journalist, essayist, and novelist.
  Documented the experience of Puerto Rican migration to New York. Major writings: The Son of Two Nations: The Private Life of a Columbia Student, among others.
- Emilio J. Pasarell, short-story writer, novelist, and essayist. He was also an accomplished historian.
  Best known for his "Origenes y desarrollo de la aficcion teatral en Puerto Rico" (Origins and development of theater in Puerto Rico).
- Pedro Pietri, poet, playwright
  Co-founder of the Nuyorican Poets Café.
- Magaly Quiñones, poet
- Ed Vega, novelist and short-story writer.
  Major awards: PEN Oakland/Josephine Miles Literary Award (2004) and Washington Post Book of the Year Award (2004).
- Iris Zavala, author, scholar, and poet.
  Major Awards: Medal of Honor, ICP; Gold Medal, AP; and Pen Club Award.

=== Beauty queens and fashion models ===
- Denise Quiñones, beauty queen
  Miss Puerto Rico 2001, Miss Universe 2001
- Maripily Rivera, model
  Model, TV host and actress

=== Business people and industrialists ===
- Juan Bigas Moulins, businessman
  Ponce Servicios was named after him.
- Salvador de Vives, Mayor of Ponce and founder of Hacienda Buena Vista
  Under his mayoral administration, the Ponce City Hall was built.
- Ramiro L. Colón
  First administrator of Cooperativa de Cafeteros de Puerto Rico, Café Rico.
- Antonio Luis Ferré, businessman and industrialist
  Owner of Ferré-Rangel media emporium.
- Luberza Oppenheimer, Isabel
  Madam of a notorious brothel.
- Francisco Parra Duperón, lawyer
  Founder of Puerto Rico's oldest law firm in continuous operation, Parra, del Valle & Limeres.
- José Miguel Rovira, industrialist
  Founder of Rovira Biscuits Corporation.
- Ermelindo Salazar, businessman
  Founded the Ponce Chamber of Commerce. Was also president of Banco Crédito y Ahorro Ponceño, one of the largest and oldest in the Island.
- Félix Saurí Vivas, businessman and hacienda holder
  Built the third-oldest residence still standing in Ponce and which became Liceo Ponceño, Puerto Rico's first girls-only school, and later the Ponce Ramada Hotel.
- Juan Serrallés, businessman and hacienda holder
  Founder of Destilería Serrallés and "Don Q".
- Salvador Vassallo, industrialist
  Founder of Industrias Vassallo and subsidiaries.
- Luis Fortuño Janeiro, journalist and member of the Puerto Rico Senate
  Founder of Ïmprenta Fortuño.

=== Civic leaders ===
- Olimpio Otero Vergés, civic leader, merchant, attorney
  Instrumental in the creation of the Parque de la Abolición, the building of road PR-123/PR-10, and the launching of 1883 Ponce Fair
- Valentín Tricoche, philanthropist and civic leader
  Donated the money for the construction of Acueducto de Ponce and what would become Hospital Tricoche.
- Rafael Rivera Esbrí, civic leader and mayor
  A hero of 1898 "El Polvorín" fire.

=== Civil servants and public servants ===
- Enrique Campos del Toro, businessman, banker, law professor and civil servant
  Served in several Commonwealth governmental positions, some of which were appointed by the president of the United States.
- Carlos A. Chardón López, educator and civil servant
  Chardón served twice as Puerto Rico's Secretary of Education
- Carlos Fernando Chardón, Secretary of State and Adjutant General of Puerto Rico.
- Antonio S. Lucchetti, engineer and public servant
  Headed the launching of island-wide public electric service in Puerto Rico.
- Mariano Villaronga-Toro, educator and public servant
  The first Commissioner of Public Instruction after the creation of the Commonwealth of Puerto Rico. Displaced English as the language of instruction and replaced it with Spanish.

=== Civil rights and/or political activists ===
- Carlos Alberto Torres, political activist
  Nationalist and political prisoner.

=== Clergy ===
- José Luis de Jesús, Creator of the "Creciendo en Gracia" sect
  Self-proclaimed "Jesus Christ Man". Can be heard in 287 radio stations; founded a 24-hr TV network; has some 2 million followers in 35 countries.
- Isolina Ferré, Catholic nun
  Recipient of the Presidential Medal of Freedom.
- Félix Lázaro Martínez, bishop of Ponce
  Educator at the Pontifical Catholic University of Puerto Rico
- Juan Fremiot Torres Oliver, bishop of Ponce
  Longest-serving bishop for the Roman Catholic Diocese of Ponce in Ponce, Puerto Rico, with 36 years of service.

=== Composers, contemporary singers, musicians and opera ===
==== Composers ====
- Julio C. Arteaga, composer of danzas, musician and teacher.
- Héctor Campos Parsi, composer and writer
  Wrote many compositions, including the incidental music for both A Midsummer Night's Dream by Shakespeare, and Dracula by Bram Stoker.
- Arístides Chavier Arévalo, pianist and composer.
  Chavier trained Luis A. Ferré as a concert-level pianist.
- Juan Morel Campos, composer of danzas.
  Founder of the Ponce Municipal Band. Wrote over 550 compositions before he died on stage at age 39.
- Juan Ríos Ovalle, composer of danzas, prolific musician and orchestra director.
- Manuel G. Tavárez, composer
  Known as "The father of the Puerto Rican danza"

==== Musicians ====
- Carlos Alomar, guitarist, composer and arranger.
  Best known for his work with David Bowie, having played on more Bowie albums than any other musician.
- Julio Alvarado Tricoche, musician, composer, band director.
  Best known for "Lejos de Ti".
- Rubén Colón Tarrats, musician, composer, band director.
- Domingo Cruz "Cocolía", musician and orchestra director.
  Director of the ultracentenarian Ponce Municipal Band.
- Papo Lucca, multi-instrumentalist musician.
  Co-founder of La Sonora Ponceña, a salsa band. He also played the piano with The Fania All-Stars.
- Elías López Sobá, classical music pianist and educator.
  Co-director of the annual Casals Festival since 2010.
- Luis Osvaldo Pino Valdivieso, musician and band director.
- Librado Net, musician, educator and painter.
  First director of the Escuela Libre de Música de Ponce and mastermind behind the creation of Puerto Rico's Free Music School system.
- Elisa Tavárez, pianist

==== Contemporary singers ====
- PJ Sin Suela, rapper, composer, and doctor.
  Pedro-Juan Vázquez Bragan better known as PJ Sin Suela has been known for his music career and his compromise with social matters in Puerto Rico.
- Lorenzo S. Alvarado Santos, singer, composer, and guitarist.
  With Johnny Albino and Félix ("Ola") Martínez, made up Trío San Juan during the years 1949–1957. Among his best tunes was the 1956 bolero "Siete notas de amor".
- Cheo Feliciano, salsa singer.
  Lead singer for the "Joe Cuba Sextet" and later with the Fania All-Stars.
- Ruth Fernández, Contralto Bolero singer and singer of up tempo songs.
  Won numerous awards internationally during her lifetime. Was also elected to the Puerto Rico Senate.
- Héctor Lavoe, Salsa and Bolero singer.
  Credited with starting the salsa movement in the early 1970s in collaboration with The Fania All-Stars.
- "Lunna", Pop and Jazz singer.
  Director of the TV show "Objetivo Fama".
- Ednita Nazario, Pop and rock singer.
  Has recorded over 50 albums, DVDs, and compilations.
- Ismael Quintana, Salsa singer and composer.
  Recipient of the 1966 "Most Popular Latin Singer of the Year" award at the Palladium Ballroom. Also sang with The Fania All-Stars.
- Pete "El Conde" Rodríguez, Salsa singer. Sang with The Fania All-Stars and also had a solo career.
- Draco Rosa, Menudo musician and singer.
  Multiple-time Grammy and Latin Grammy winning musician, singer-songwriter, composer, multi-instrumentalist, record producer, poet and entrepreneur.
- Carmín Vega, singer and comedian.
  Known as "The woman with a thousand voices and a thousand faces".
- Juan Vélez, singer, musician and songwriter.
  Winner of the fourth season of Objetivo Fama.

==== Opera ====
- Lizzie Graham, Soprano singer
  Trained 19th century international soprano singer Amalia Paoli.
- Amalia Paoli, soprano opera singer.
- Antonio Paoli, tenor opera singer
  First person in world history to record an entire opera
- Melliangee Pérez, soprano opera singer
  Recipient of UNESCO's Soprano of the Year award.
- Graciela Rivera, soprano opera singer
  First Puerto Rican to sing a lead role at the Metropolitan Opera.

==== Theatrical arts ====
- Luis Torres Nadal, playwright, poet, educator, actor, choreographer, and theatrical director.

=== Criminals and outlaws ===
- Antonio Correa Cotto
  Notorious 1930s outlaw.

=== Diplomats ===
- Teodoro Moscoso, diplomat and civil servant
  Former U.S. Ambassador to Venezuela and head of Alliance for Progress

=== Educators ===
- Alfredo M. Aguayo, educator and writer
  Established the first laboratory of child psychology at the University of Havana
- Carlos Albizu Miranda, psychologist and educator
  Founder of Albizu University.
- María Teresa Babín Cortés, educator, literary critic, and essayist
  Author of "Panorama de la Cultura Puertorriqueña", among others.
- Hemeterio Colón Warens, educator, land surveyor, and mayor of Cayey
  Founded Colegio Central Ponceño in 1883.
- Jaime L. Drew, educator, civil servant, writer and engineer
  Author of "Libro de Poemas en Ingles y Espanol", among others.
- Antonio García Padilla, scholar, and civil servant
  President of the University of Puerto Rico.
- Manuel González Pató, educator, writer, and sportsman.
  Puerto Rico National Olympic team coach
- Domingo Marrero Navarro, educator and writer
  Author of award-winning "El Centauro: Persona y Pensamiento de Ortega y Gasset" (Institute of Puerto Rican Culture)
- Lolita Tizol, educator
  Taught music for a meager $50 per month to an entire generation of Puerto Rican children.

=== Governors ===
- Luis A. Ferré
  Also an industrialist and philanthropist. Founder of the Museo de Arte de Ponce and Ponce Cement, Inc.
- Rafael Hernández Colón
  Two-time governor of the Commonwealth of Puerto Rico, and, at 35, Puerto Rico's youngest governor ever.
- Roberto Sánchez Vilella
  Governor of the Commonwealth of Puerto Rico.

==== First Ladies of Puerto Rico ====
- Conchita Dapena
  First Lady of Puerto Rico (1965–1966).
- Rosario Ferré
  First Lady of Puerto Rico (1970–1972).
- Lila Mayoral Wirshing
  Youngest First Lady of Puerto Rico (1973–1977, 1985–1992).
- Lorenza Ramírez de Arellano
  First Lady of Puerto Rico (1969–1970).

=== Historians ===
- Silvia Álvarez Curbelo, architectural and cultural historian
  Founding member of the Puerto Rican Association of Historians, and director of the Center for Communications Research at the University of Puerto Rico.
- Francisco Lluch Mora, historian
  Wrote "Orígenes y Fundación de Ponce y Otras Noticias Relativas a su Desarrollo Urbano, Demográfico y Cultural (Siglos XVI-XIX)".
- Ramón Marín, historian
  Wrote the classical work: "Las fiestas populares de Ponce."
- Antonio Mirabal, political historian and poet
  Author of "De Rosas a Trujillo: estudio histórico comparativo de las tiranías en América." Long-time chief archivist at Archivo Historico de Ponce
- Eduardo Neumann Gandía, historian
  Author of "Verdadera y Auténtica Historia de la Ciudad de Ponce."
- Andrés Ramos Mattei, sugar industry historian
  Said to be "the undisputed authority" on the subject of Puerto Rico's sugar industry.
- Gladys Esther Tormes González, historian
  Head archivist and longest-serving archivist at the "Archivo Historico de Ponce".

=== Journalists ===
- Carmen Dominicci, news anchor.
- Juan González, journalist
  Columnist for New York's Daily News, and co-host the radio and television program Democracy Now!.
- Washington Lloréns, journalist, writer, linguist, and scholar.
- Jorge L. Ramos, news anchor
  Emmy Award-winning New York City television news anchor.
- Ramón Enrique Torres, news anchor.

=== Judges, law enforcement and firefighters ===
- Jeannette Ramos, Judge, Puerto Rico Court of Appeals
  Puerto Rico district judge and a First Lady of Puerto Rico (1967–1969).
- Pedro Toledo, Puerto Rico Police Commissioner
  Main negotiator during the 1987 Atlanta Prison Riots.
- Raúl Gándara Cartagena, Fire Commissioner
  The first and longest-serving Fire Commissioner in Puerto Rico.

=== Military ===
- Agüeybaná (Great Sun), Supreme Taíno chief
  Supreme Cacique of Puerto Rico who welcomed Juan Ponce de León to the island.
- Agüeybaná II, Supreme cacique of the entire island of "Borikén"
  Led the Taínos in the fight against Juan Ponce de León and the Spanish conquistadores in the Taíno rebellion of 1511.
- Ramón Colón-López, chief master sergeant, U.S. Air Force
  First and only Latino among the first six airmen to be awarded the Air Force Combat Action Medal.
- Antonio J. Ramos, brigadier general, U.S. Air Force
  First Latino to serve as commander, Air Force Security Assistance Center, Air Force Materiel Command.
- José Antonio Muñiz lieutenant colonel, U.S. Air Force
  Co-founder of the Puerto Rico Air National Guard.
- Horacio Rivero, admiral, U.S. Navy
  First Puerto Rican and second Hispanic to become admiral (four-star) in the U.S. Navy. Commander of the American fleet that effected the blockade of the Soviet ships during the 1962 Cuban Missile Crisis.
- Eurípides Rubio, captain, U.S. Army
  Posthumously awarded the Medal of Honor for his actions at Tay Ninh Province in the Republic of Vietnam on 8 November 1966.
- Raúl G. Villaronga
  First Puerto Rican to be elected mayor in the state of Texas. (Mayor of Killeen, Texas).
- Luis R. Visot, major general, U. S. Army
  Chief of Staff of the United States Army Reserve.

=== Physicians, scientists and inventors ===
- Carlos E. Chardón Palacios, mycologist
  Father of Puerto Rican mycology and first Puerto Rican appointed as Chancellor of University of Puerto Rico.
- Martín Corchado, physician and medical researcher
  Was also president of the Autonomist Party of Puerto Rico.
- Manuel de la Pila Iglesias, physician and medical pioneer
  Introduced the first EKG and X-ray machines to Puerto Rico. Considered to be "one of the giants of Puerto Rican medicine".
- José N. Gándara, medical director at Hospital Tricoche
  Lead physician helping victims of the Ponce massacre, and witness at the trials of the accused Nacionalistas. Was Secretary of Health of Puerto Rico. Co-founder of the Popular Democratic Party of Puerto Rico.
- Joxel García, Assistant Secretary for Health,
  First Puerto Rican to be appointed Assistant Secretary for Health, U.S. Department of Health and Human Services.
- Julio J. Henna, physician and political activist
  Co-founder of New York City's French Hospital.
- Rafael López Nussa, physician and public servant
  Pioneered heart surgeries in Puerto Rico.
- Rafael Pujals, physician, civic leader and political activist
  First physician with a medical degree in the city and medical director at both Hospital de Damas and Hospital Tricoche.

=== Politicians ===
- Pedro Albizu Campos
  President and principal leader of the Puerto Rican Nationalist Party.
- Román Baldorioty de Castro
  Considered "The Father of Puerto Rico's Autonomy".
- Pedro Colón
  Member of the Wisconsin State Assembly.
- Federico Degetau
  The first Resident Commissioner to the United States.
- Manuel V. Domenech
  Mayor of Ponce. Member of the Puerto Rico House of Representatives. Also an engineer and civil servant.
- Maurice Ferre
  Former mayor of Miami, Florida.
- Marially González Huertas
  Vice-president of the Senate of Puerto Rico.
- María de Pérez Almiroty
  First woman elected to the Senate of Puerto Rico
- Ernesto Ramos Antonini
  Former Speaker of Puerto Rico's House of Representatives.
- Luis Ernesto Ramos Yordán
  President of the Puerto Rico House of Representatives
- Peter Rivera
  Member of the New York State Assembly.
- Larry Seilhamer Rodríguez
  Speaker of the Senate of Puerto Rico. Also basketball player in BSN.
- Rafael Cordero Santiago, long-serving mayor of Ponce; elected in 1989, and re-elected to three additional 4-year terms. Died in office.

=== Sportspeople ===
==== Baseball players and coaches ====
- Roberto Alomar
  Former baseball player, MLB All-Star, third Puerto Rican inducted to the Baseball Hall of Fame (2011).
- Pedro Miguel Caratini
  Baseball player.
- Orlando Cepeda
  Baseball player and member of the Baseball Hall of Fame.
- Francisco "Pancho" Coímbre
  Negro league baseball All-Star player.
- Carlos Correa
  Minnesota Twins player.
- Luis DeLeón
  Former Major League Baseball pitcher for the San Diego Padres and the Seattle Mariners.
- José Espada
  Major League Baseball player for the San Diego Padres.
- Coco Laboy
  MLB player with San Francisco Giants, Montreal Expos and the St. Louis Cardinals.
- Ricky Ledée
  Nine-year veteran in MLB playing as an outfielder.
- Javy López
  Former catcher in Major League Baseball with the Atlanta Braves, the Baltimore Orioles and the Boston Red Sox.
- Felix Maldonado
  MLB baseball manager.
- Pepe Mangual
  MLB player with the Montreal Expos and New York Mets.
- Paquito Montaner
  First Puerto Rican baseball player to throw a "no-hitter" in Puerto Rican baseball.
- Millito Navarro
  First Puerto Rican to play in Negro leagues and the American Negro League's last surviving member.
- Luis Quiñones
  Former Major League Baseball player for the Oakland Athletics, San Francisco Giants, Chicago Cubs, Cincinnati Reds and the Minnesota Twins.
- Edwin Rodriguez
  Former Florida Marlins team manager.
- Benito Santiago
  Former 20-season catcher in Major League Baseball.
- Félix Torres
  MLB player with Los Angeles Angels, Cincinnati Redlegs and Philadelphia Phillies.
- Javier Vázquez
  Former MLB pitcher.
- Otto Vélez
  MLB player with New York Yankees, Toronto Blue Jays, and Cleveland Indians.
- Enrique "Coco" Vicéns
  Basketball player with Leones de Ponce. Also a politician.

==== Basketball players ====
- Juan "Pachín" Vicéns
  Basketball player. Led the Lenoes de Ponce team to six championships.
- César Bocachica
  Olympic basketball player.
- Manolo Cintrón
  Former Puerto Rico Basketball league player. Also managed Puerto Rico National team to medals at multiple international games.
- Bobby Joe Hatton
  Puerto Rico basketball league and Puerto Rico Olympic basketball team player.
- Miguel "Ali" Berdiel
  Puerto Rico professional basketball league player and National Olympic team medalist.

==== Boxers ====
- José "Chegüi" Torres
  WBA light heavyweight champion and International Boxing Hall of Fame inductee.
- Carlos Ortíz
  Three-time world boxing champion.
- Alex Sánchez
  Light flyweight boxer and WBO's world Strawweight championship.
- Mario Santiago
  2018 World Boxing Council Caribbean Featherweight champion in 2018.
- Juan Carazo
  Two time world championship challenger, born in Ponce.

==== Other sportspeople ====
- Ricardo Busquets, Olympic swimmer.
- Javier Culson, track and field athlete
  Olympic medalist specializing in the 400-metre hurdles.
- Germán Figueroa, professional wrestler.
- Juan "Papo" Franceschi, track and field athlete
  Gold medalist at Central American and Caribbean Games
- Edgardo Guilbe, track and field athlete
  Olympic sprinter.
- Julio Enrique Monagas, sportsman, public servant and civic leader.
  Considered "The father of Olympic sports in Puerto Rico."
- Francisco Rosa Rivera, professional bodybuilder.
- Félix Serrallés, professional racing driver.
- Debora Seilhamer, Olympic volleyball player.
- Jesse Vassallo, swimmer
  Former president (2004-2008), Puerto Rico Swimming Federation and member of the International Swimming Hall of Fame.
- Ivelisse Vélez, professional wrestler
  Lucha Underground.

=== Visual artists ===
- Albizu, Olga, abstract expressionist painter.
  Her works include album covers for Stan Getz
- Escobar, Elizam, painter and political activist.
  Dean of the Painting Department at the Escuela de Artes Plásticas de Puerto Rico, San Juan, Puerto Rico.
- Irizarry, Epifanio, painter and educator.
  His works include "Flamboyan" (1972).
- Penne, María Luisa, painter, educator, and graphic artist.
- Pou, Miguel, painter.
  Patrons include Museo de Arte de Ponce, Puerto Rico Museum of Contemporary Art and Puerto Rico Museum of Art.
- Rios Rey, Rafael, muralist.
  Patrons include Ponce YMCA Organization, Banco Crédito y Ahorro Ponceño, and Puerto Rico Iron Works.
- Torres Martinó, José A., painter.
  Co-founder of the Escuela de Artes Plásticas y Diseño de Puerto Rico.
- Quiñones, Lee, graffiti painter and actor
  Patrons include El Museo del Barrio, Whitney Museum of Art, Museum of the City of New York and the Groninger Museum
- Torres, Wichie, Oil canvas painter.
  Exponent of the costumbrismo movement.

== Table summary by year of birth ==
The following sortable table is a summary list of notable Ponceños and Ponceñistas arranged chronologically by year of birth.

Name	Born	Died	Profession/Occupation/Notability	Notes
José Ortíz de la Renta	1765	1850	Mayor	DOB and DOD are approximate
Salvador de Vives	1784	1845	Businessman	-
Juan Rondón	1790	1843	Mayor	DOB and DOD are approximate
Valentín Tricoche	1800	1863	Philanthropist	DOB is approximate
Juan José Cartagena	1815	1895	Mayor	DOB and DOD are approximate
Rafael León y García	1818	1888	Mayor	DOB and DOD are approximate
Juan Cortada y Quintana	1820	1889	Mayor	DOB is approximate
Timoteo Luberza	1820	1895	Architect	DOB and DOD are approximate
Juan Bertoli Calderoni	1820	1900	Architect	DOB and DOD are approximate
Román Baldorioty de Castro	1822	1889	Politician	Ponceñista
Francisco Parra Duperón	1827	1899	Businessman	Ponceñista
Rafael Pujals	1830	1889	Physician	Ponceñista. DOB is approximate
Ramón Marín	1832	1902	Historian	Ponceñista
Miguel Rosich y Mass	1835	1915	Mayor	DOB and DOD are approximate
Hemeterio Colón Warens	1839	1889	Educator	Possibly a Ponceñista
Martín Corchado	1839	1898	Physician	Ponceñista
Ermelindo Salazar	1840	1920	Businessman	DOB and DOD are approximate
José Lloréns Echevarría	1840	1920	Mayor	DOB and DOD are approximate
Manuel Gregorio Tavárez	1843	1883	Composer	-
Lizzie Graham	1844	1927	Singer	-
Olimpio Otero Vergés	1845	1911	Civic leader	-
Juan José Potous	1845	1920	Mayor	DOB and DOD are approximate
Luis P. Valdivieso	1845	1920	Mayor	DOB and DOD are approximate
Juan Serrallés Colón	1845	1921	Businessman	-
Enrique Chevalier	1845	1925	Mayor	DOB and DOD are approximate
Luis Porrata-Doría	1845	1925	Mayor	DOB and DOD are approximate
Julio J. Henna	1848	1924	Physician	-
Santiago Oppenheimer	1850	1920	Mayor	DOB and DOD are approximate
Luis Gautier	1850	1920	Mayor	DOB and DOD are approximate
Antonio Arias	1850	1940	Mayor	DOB and DOD are approximate
Eduardo Armstrong	1851	1895	Mayor	-
Félix Saurí Vivas	1852	1912	Businessman	DOB and DOD are approximate
Eduardo Neumann Gandía	1852	1913	Historian	-
Simón Moret Gallart	1853	1923	Mayor	-
Juan Morel Campos	1857	1896	Composer	-
José de Guzmán Benítez	1857	1921	Mayor	-
Ulpiano Colóm	1861	1920	Mayor	DOD is approximate
Amalia Paoli	1861	1941	Opera singer	DOB is approximate
Pedro Juan Rosaly	1862	1920	Mayor	DOD is approximate
Federico Degetau	1862	1914	Politician	Also civil servant
Juan Ríos Ovalle	1863	1928	Composer	-
Juan Bigas Moulins	1863	1934	Businessman	-
Vicente Balbás Capó	1864	1926	Mayor	DOB and DOD are approximate
Domingo Cruz "Cocolía"	1864	1934	Musician	-
Alfredo Miguel Aguayo Sánchez	1866	1948	Educator	Born in Ponce, practiced mostly in Cuba
Arístides Chavier Arévalo	1867	1942	Composer	-
Luis Yordán Dávila	1869	1932	Mayor	DOB and DOD are approximate
Manuel V. Domenech	1869	1942	Politician	Ponceñista. Also an architect and civil servant
Blas Silva	1869	1949	Architect	Ponceñista
Rafael Rivera Esbrí	1870	1965	Civic leader	Also became mayor
Abelardo Aguilú, Jr.	1870	1940	Mayor	DOB and DOD are approximate
Francisco Parra Capó	1871	1945	Mayor	DOD is approximate
Rodulfo del Valle	1871	1948	Mayor	DOB and DOD are approximate
Antonio Paoli	1871	1946	Opera singer	-
José Tormos Diego	1875	1950	Mayor	DOB and DOD are approximate
Jaime L. Drew	1876	1948	Educator	-
Elisa Tavárez	1879	1960	Pianist	-
Blas Oliveras	1880	1950	Mayor	DOB and DOD are approximate
Pedro Miguel Caratini	1880	1940	Baseball player	DOB and DOD are approximate
Antonio Mirabal	1880	1966	Historian	-
Miguel Pou	1880	1968	Painter	-
Guillermo Vivas Valdivieso	1881	1940	Mayor	DOD is approximate
Alfredo Wiechers Pieretti	1881	1964	Architect	-
Emilio Fagot	1883	1946	Mayor	-
Vicente Balbás Capó	1884	1926	Mayor	-
Manuel de la Pila Iglesias	1884	1950	Physician	-
Rafael López Nussa	1885	1943	Physician	Ponceñista. Also a public servant
José Leandro Montalvo Guenard	1885	1950	Mayor	DOB and DOD are approximate
Julio Alvarado Tricoche	1886	1970	Musician	-
Antonio S. Luchetti	1888	1958	Civil servant	-
Andrés Grillasca Salas	1888	1973	Mayor	-
Lolita Tizol	1890	1933	Educator	-
Francisco Porrata-Doría	1890	1971	Architect	-
Pedro Albizu Campos	1891	1965	Politician	-
Juan Emilio Viguié	1891	1966	Film maker	-
Emilio J. Pasarell	1891	1974	Writer	-
Paquito Montaner	1894	1945	Baseball player	-
Librado Net	1895	1964	Musician	-
Raúl Gándara Cartagena	1895	1989	Public servant	-
Juan Luis Boscio	1896	1980	Mayor	-
Carlos E. Chardón	1897	1965	Public servant	-
Ernesto Ramos Antonini	1898	1963	Politician	-
Washington Lloréns	1899	1989	Writer	-
Enrique Campos del Toro	1900	1970	Businessman	Also public servant; DOD is approximate
Julio Enrique Monagas	1900	1984	Public servant	DOB is approximate
Isabel Luberza Oppenheimer	1901	1974	Businesswoman	-
Ramiro L. Colón	1904	1983	Businessman	Also politician
Luis A. Ferré	1904	2003	Politician	Also industrialist and philanthropist
Pedro J. Labarthe	1905	1966	Poet	-
Millito Navarro	1905	2011	Baseball player	-
Mariano Villaronga Toro	1906	1987	Public servant	-
José N. Gándara	1907	1954	Physician	Also public servant
Domingo Marrero Navarro	1909	1960	Educator	-
Pancho Coimbre	1909	1989	Baseball player	-
María Teresa Babín Cortés	1910	1989	Educator	Also a writer
Teodoro Moscoso	1910	1992	Diplomat	Also a civil servant
Horacio Rivero, Jr.	1910	2000	Military	-
Rafael Ríos Rey	1911	1980	Painter	-
José Dapena Laguna	1912	1991	Mayor	-
Félix Franco-Oppenheimer	1912	2004	Mayor	-
Manuel González Pató	1913	1973	Educator	-
María Luisa Penne	1913	2005	Painter	-
Roberto Sánchez Vilella	1913	1997	Governor	Ponceñista
Isolina Ferré	1914	2000	Clergy	-
César Andreu Iglesias	1915	1976	Writer	-
Epifanio “Fano” Irizarry	1915	2001	Painter	-
Luis Ernesto Ramos Yordán	1915	2005	Politician	
José Antonio Torres Martinó	1916	2011	Painter	-
Eduardo Ruberté Bisó	1917	1985	Mayor	DOB and DOD are approximate
Carlos Juan Cintrón	1918	1998	Mayor	-
José Antonio Muñiz	1919	1960	Military	-
Ruth Fernández	1919	2012	Singer	-
Juan H. Cintrón García	1919	2012	Mayor	-
Lorenzo S. Alvarado Santos	1920	1982	Singer	-
Carlos Albizu Miranda	1920	1984	Educator	-
José Miguel Rovira	1920	1993	Industrialist	DOB is approximate
Graciela Rivera	1921	2011	Opera singer	-
Héctor Campos Parsi	1922	1998	Composer	-
Tommy Muñiz	1922	2009	Actor	-
Olga Albizu	1924	2005	Painter	-
Francisco Lluch Mora	1924	2006	Historian	-
Juan Fremiot Torres Oliver	1925	2012	Clergy	Ponceñista
Enrique "Coco" Vicéns	1926	1915	Basketball player	Ponceñista. Also a politician
Esther Sandoval	1927	2006	Actress	-
Elías López Sobá	1927	2023	Musician	Also an educator
Luis A. "Wito" Morales	1928	2011	Mayor	-
Marta Romero	1928	2013	Actress	-
Jeannette Ramos	1930	2021	Judge	DOB is approximate
José G. Tormos Vega	1932	1993	Mayor	DOB is approximate
Walter Mercado	1932	2019	Astrologer	-
Félix Torres	1932	2025	Baseball player	-
Pete "El Conde" Rodríguez	1933	2000	Singer	-
Luis Osvaldo Pino Valdivieso	1933	2003	Band director	-
Gladys Esther Tormes González	1933	–	Historian	-
Juan "Pachín" Vicéns	1934	2007	Basketball player	-
Elín Ortíz	1934	2016	Actor	-
Mario Montez	1935	2013	Actor	-
Maurice Ferre	1935	2019	Politician	-
Cheo Feliciano	1935	2014	Singer	-
Ed Vega	1936	2008	Writer	-
José "Chegüi" Torres	1936	2009	Boxer	-
Iván Ayala Cádiz	1936	–	Mayor	DOB is approximate
Carlos Ortíz	1936	2022	Boxer	-
Félix Lázaro Martínez	1936	–	Clergy	Ponceñista
Míriam Colón	1936	2017	Actress	-
Iris Zavala	1936	2020	Writer	-
Rafael Hernández Colón	1936	2019	Politician	-
Ismael Quintana	1937	2016	Singer	-
Orlando Cepeda	1937	2024	Baseball player	-
Eurípides Rubio	1938	1966	Military	-
Félix Maldonado	1938	2010	Baseball manager	-
José Dapena Thompson	1938	–	Mayor	DOB is approximate
Raúl G. Villaronga	1938	2021	Military	-
Rosario Ferré	1938	2016	Writer	-
César Bocachica	1938	–	Basketball player	-
Coco Laboy	1940	–	Baseball player	-
Silvia Álvarez Curbelo	1940	–	Historian	-
Rubén Colón Tarrats	1940	–	Musician	-
Andrés Ramos Mattei	1941	1987	Historian	-
Rafael Cordero Santiago	1942	2004	Mayor	-
Salvador Vassallo	1942	2007	Industrialist	-
Luis Torres Nadal	1943	1986	Playwright	-
Pedro Pietri	1944	2004	Poet	-
Delis Castillo Rivera de Santiago	1945	–	Mayor	DOB is approximate
Juan "Papo" Franceschi	1946	1990	Track and field athlete	-
Jose Luis De Jesus Miranda	1946	2013	Clergy	-
Héctor Lavoe	1946	1993	Singer	-
Peter Rivera	1946	–	Politician	-
Papo Lucca	1946	–	Musician	-
Juan González	1947	–	Journalist	-
Carmen Nydia Velázquez	1947	–	Comedian	Also a singer
Elizam Escobar	1948	2021	Poet	Also an author
María Meléndez	1950		Mayor	-
Otto Vélez	1950		Baseball player	-
Francisco Zayas Seijo	1951	–	Mayor	-
Carlos Alomar	1951	–	Musician	-
Pepe Mangual	1952	–	Baseball player	-
Wichie Torres	1952	2020	Painter	-
Teófilo Torres	1954	–	Actor	-
Larry Seilhamer Rodríguez	1954	–	Politician	Ponceñista. Also basketball player.
Antonio García Padilla	1954	–	Educator	-
Carmín Vega	1955	–	Singer	-
Ednita Nazario	1955	–	Singer	-
Gerónimo Lluberas	1956	2003	Humanitarian	Also a physician
Ramón Enrique Torres	1956	–	News anchor	-
Luis R. Visot	1956	–	Military	DOB is approximate
Andrés Mignucci	1957	–	Architect	-
Luis de León	1958	–	Baseball player	-
Lunna	1960	–	Singer	-
Lee Quiñones	1960	–	Painter	-
Edwin Rodríguez	1960	–	Baseball personality	-
Jesse Vassallo	1961	–	Olympic swimmer	-
Luis Raúl	1962	–	Actor	-
Joxel García	1962	–	Physician	-
Luis Quiñones	1962	–	Baseball player	-
Marisol Calero	1963	–	Actress	-
Manolo Cintrón	1963	–	Basketball player	-
Benito Santiago	1965	–	Baseball player	-
Edgardo Guilbe	1966	–	Olympic sprinter	-
Carmen Dominicci	1966	–	News anchor	-
Roberto Alomar	1968	–	Baseball player	-
Pedro Colón	1968	–	Politician	-
Draco Rosa	1969	–	Singer	Ponceñista
Javy López	1970	–	Baseball player	-
Ramón Colón-López	1971	–	Military	-
Francisco Rosa Rivera	1972	2010	Bodybuilder	-
Alex Sánchez	1973	–	Boxer	-
Ricky Ledée	1973	–	Baseball player	-
Ricardo Busquets	1974	–	Olympic swimmer	-
Germán Figueroa	1975	–	Wrestler	-
Melliangee Pérez	1976	–	Soprano singer	-
Javier Vázquez	1976	–	Baseball player	-
Marco Zunino	1976	–	Actor	-
Bobby Joe Hatton	1976	–	Basketball player	-
Maripily Rivera	1977	–	Model	-
Maruja Fuentes	1978	2010	Architect	-
Mario Santiago	1978	–	Boxer	-
Lymari Nadal	1978	–	Actress*	-
Denise Quiñones	1980	–	Beauty pageant	Also actress
Juan Vélez	1983	–	Singer*	-
Miguel "Ali" Berdiel	1983	–	Basketball player	-
Maria-Elena Laas	1983	–	Actress	-
Javier Culson	1984	–	Olympic hurdler	-
Debora Seilhamer	1985	–	Olympic volleyball player	-
Ivelisse Vélez	1988	–	Wrestler	-
Félix Serrallés	1992	–	Racing driver	-

== See also ==
- List of Puerto Ricans
- List of tourist attractions in Ponce, Puerto Rico
