= Silvia Álvarez Curbelo =

Puerto Rican historian

- Born: 1940 (age 85–86); Ponce, Puerto Rico
- Occupations: Architectural and cultural Historian; Writer, Educator
- Writing career
- Notable work: Un país del porvenir: el afán de modernidad en Puerto Rico (Siglo XIX)

Silvia Álvarez Curbelo (born in Ponce, Puerto Rico, in 1940) is a Puerto Rican historian, and writer. She is best known for her book Un país del porvenir: el afán de modernidad en Puerto Rico (Siglo XIX).

== Early years ==
Álvarez Curbelo was born in Ponce, Puerto Rico. She was a fellow at the David Rockefeller Center for Latin American Studies in 2004/2005.

== Career ==
Álvarez Curbelo is a professor of Communications at the University of Puerto Rico, Río Piedras campus. She is a historian and is a founding member of the Asociación Puertorriqueña de Historiadores (Puerto Rican Association of Historians). She is curator of the Entresiglos, Puerto Rico 1890–1910 exhibition, and the permanent exhibition of the history of San Juan, Puerto Rico, at the Museo de San Juan. She is currently director of the Centro de Investigaciones en Comunicación (Center for Communications Research) at the University of Puerto Rico.

== Works ==
Among her better known works are:

- Un país del porvenir: el afán de modernidad en Puerto Rico (Siglo XIX) (Ediciones Callejón; San Juan, Puerto Rico) (2001)
- Del nacionalismo al populismo: Cultura y Politica en Puerto Rico. (Ediciones Huraca; Rio Piedras, Puerto Rico) (1993)
- Historias vivas: Historiografía puertorriqueña contemporánea. (1996)
- Ilusión de Francia: Arquitectura y afrancesamiento en Puerto Rico. (1997)
- Hispanofilia: Arquitectura y vida en Puerto Rico 1900–1950. (1998)
- Los arcos de la memoria: el '98 de los pueblos puertorriqueños. (1999)

== Recognitions ==
She is honored at Ponce's Park of Illustrious Ponce Citizens.

== See also ==
- List of Puerto Ricans
- List of Puerto Rican writers
