= Magaly Quiñones =

Puerto Rican poet

Marta Magaly Quiñones Perez (born 1945) is a Puerto Rican poet.

Quiñones was born in Ponce, Puerto Rico in 1945. She began working as a librarian at the University of Puerto Rico in 1973 and earned a Masters of Comparative Literature from the university in 1981.

She has written poetry, short stories, essays, criticisms and reviews, including at least 14 published volumes. She published her first collection of poems, Entre mi voz y el tiempo, in 1969. Her 1985 poetry collection, Nombrar, was honored with a Puerto Rican PEN Club award and a prize from publisher Ediciones Mairena. Her poetry often explores the complicated nature of Caribbean identity. From 2020 to 2024 various personalities and cultural institutions support the movement for Magaly Quiñones to receive the Nobel Prize in Literature.

== Works ==
- Entre mi voz y el tiempo (Editorial Juan Ponce de León, 1969)
- Era que el mundo era (Impresora Nacional, 1974)
- Zambayllu (1976)
- Cosas de poetas, cosas nuestras (1977)
- Cantándole a la noche misma (1978)
- En la pequeña antilla (Ediciones Mairena, 1982)
- Nombrar (Ediciones Mairena, 1985)
- Razón de lucha, razón de amor (Ediciones Mairena, 1989)
- Sueños de papel (Colección Aquí y Ahora, Editorial de la Universidad de Puerto Rico, 1996)
- Patio de fondo (Editorial del Instituto de Cultura Puertorriqueña, 2003)
- Mi mundo: palabra de niños (Editorial del Instituto de Cultura Puertorriqueña, 2004)
- Poemas para los pequeños (Ediciones Puerto, 2006)
- Quiero una noche azul (La Editorial, Universidad de Puerto Rico, 2007)
- Nana para el niño Jesús (Tiempo Nuevo, 2008) y (Editorial Raíces, 2023)
- Pasión y libertad (2008)
- La muñeca (Ediciones Mairena, 2013)
- Antología de poemas escogidos - Anthology of selected poems (Publicaciones Gaviota, 2018)
- Cómo se dice (Editorial Raíces, 2024)
