= Maruja Fuentes =

Puerto Rican architect and designer (1978–2010)

- Born: March 4, 1978; Ponce, Puerto Rico
- Died: June 28, 2010 (aged 32)
- Known for: Industrial Design, Architecture, Environmental Design
- Notable work: Green Pockets, Leaning Molds
- Awards: Red Dot Award 2009

Maruja Fuentes (March 4, 1978 – June 28, 2010) was a Puerto Rican architect and an industrial and environmental designer.

== Biography ==
A native of Ponce, Puerto Rico, Maruja studied environmental design at the University of Puerto Rico, earned an undergraduate degree in architecture from the Catholic University of America, completed her master studies in architecture at Georgia Tech and studied furniture and textile design at Savannah College of Art and Design.

== Works ==
Some of her work was featured in 2008 as part of the exhibit space IDSA.NYC reserved at the International Contemporary Furniture Fair (ICFF). She achieved recognition with "Leaning Molds - Urban Furniture" winning a Red Dot Award 2009 for product design, one of the highest recognitions in the discipline of Design. In the Salone del Mobile, in Milan, on 2009 her work "Green Pockets" was a success too. The idea was to seed plants and flowers on the walls using little flower pots built up on ceramic and mixing them with tiles with the same shape.

- Green Pockets (2009)
- Planter Wall Tiles (2009)
- Eco-Friendly Leaning Molds (2008)
- Flower Pods
- Bent Glass
- Nesting Lamp

She was teacher and Director on the Department of Industrial Design at the Escuela de Artes Plásticas y Diseño de Puerto Rico. Also was a teacher of Architecture in the School of Architecture of Puerto Rico. Her last year was teacher and coordinator of the Industrial Design programme of the Escuela Internacional de Diseño of the University of Turabo.

=== About her work ===
All my projects start with a concept. I believe that it is the key element for a good piece or design. The concept is the soul of the piece-- that which establishes its individuality. The majority of my concepts are derived from nature and aspects of daily life that usually go unnoticed or taken for granted.

=== About her aspirations ===
I'm such a dreamer; this is a hard question to answer. I guess, in summary, I want to go as far as I can go with my designs and love the journey.

== Death ==
Maruja died on June 28, 2010, after losing her battle against leukemia, a type of cancer. She was 32 years old.
