= Andrés Ramos Mattei =

Puerto Rican historian

- Born: Andrés Antonio Ramos Mattei; 5 November 1941; Ponce, Puerto Rico
- Died: 11 February 1988 (aged 46); New Brunswick, New Jersey
- Occupation: Historian

Andrés Antonio ("Tony") Ramos Mattei (5 November 1941 – 11 February 1988) was a Puerto Rican sugar industry historian. He is considered the "undisputed authority" on the subject of Puerto Rico's sugar industry.

== Early life ==
Ramos Mattei was born in Ponce, Puerto Rico, in 1941.

== Career ==
Ramos Mattei is considered by his professional peers "a major figure in the world of sugar history...one of its most skillful and accomplished craftsmen...a force among historians of Puerto Rico and the Caribbean, and a scholar of stature among students of the sugar industry".

Ramos Mattei's career was a multifaceted one, as were his scholarly writings. A student of Puerto Rico in general, he approached insular issues in the broadest possible perspective. His work was often explicitly comparative but with a regional, Caribbean-wide twist in its implications. He was an active member of the Association of Caribbean Historians, where he was instrumental in establishing fruitful interaction between his fellow historians in Puerto Rico and those of other Caribbean nations.

== Political interests ==
Ramos Mattei's intellectual passion revolved around the peculiar historical processes of his native Puerto Rican society where he wrote about its enduring and perplexing colonial drama. In this regard, he was most interested in the life and thought of Ramon Emeterio Betances, the Puerto Rican abolitionist, revolutionary, and "father of the Puerto Rican nation". Ramos' contributions in this field was almost as intense as his contributions to the history of the sugar cane industry.

== Works ==
Ramos Mattei is best known for his work on the transition from the hacienda to the modern land-and-factory combination in Puerto Rico's sugar sector. His book titled "La hacienda azucarera" is a landmark study, based on an investigation into the Serralles plantation archives in Ponce.

- La hacienda azucarera : su crecimiento y crisis en Puerto Rico (siglo XIX). Centro de Estudios de la Realidad Puertorriquena (CEREP). San Juan, Puerto Rico. 1981.
- Betances en el ciclo revolucionario antillano: 1867-1875 San Juan, Puerto Rico. 1987.
- Azúcar y esclavitud en Puerto Rico: la formación de la economía de haciendas en Ponce, 1815-1845. In, "Azúcar y esclavitud." Ed. Andrés A. Ramos Mattei. Río Piedras, Puerto Rico: Oficina de Publicaciones de la Facultad de Humanidades, Universidad de Puerto Rico. 1982.
- La sociedad del azúcar en Puerto Rico, 1870-1910. Universidad de Puerto Rico, Recinto de Río Piedras. Rio Piedras, Puerto Rico. 1988.

== Death ==
Ramos Mattei died on 11 February 1988, at the age of 47, in New Brunswick, New Jersey, after a long battle with cancer.

== Honors and recognitions ==
In 2009, the Association of Caribbean Historians honored him issuing a professional prize in his honor. He is also recognized at Ponce's Park of Illustrious Ponce Citizens.

== See also ==
- Ponce, Puerto Rico
- List of Puerto Ricans
