= César Bocachica =

Puerto Rican basketball player

Leones de Ponce
- Position: Point Guard
- League: Baloncesto Superior Nacional

Personal information
- Born: July 28, 1938 (age 88) Ponce, Puerto Rico

Career information
- Playing career: 1960–present

César Bocachica (born 28 July 1938) is a Puerto Rican former basketball player who competed in the 1960 Summer Olympics.

Bocachica is from Ponce, Puerto Rico. He is an engineer by training. On 12 December 2013, Bocachica was honored with a ceremony and added to the list of illustrious Ponce citizens at the Park of the Illustrious Ponce Citizens in Ponce's Tricentennial Park.
