= Lorenzo Alvarado Santos =

- Also known as: Chago
- Born: Lorenzo Santiago Alvarado Santos; October 26, 1920; Ponce, Puerto Rico
- Died: July 23, 1982 (aged 61) Caguas, Puerto Rico
- Genres: Bolero
- Occupations: singer, composer, and guitarist
- Years active: 1939–1982
- Formerly of: Trío San Juan

Lorenzo Santiago Alvarado Santos (October 26, 1920 – July 23, 1982) was a Puerto Rican singer, composer and guitarist. He became internationally famous with Johnny Albino and Félix ("Ola") Martínez as part of the Trío San Juan during the years 1949–1957. Among his best tunes was the 1956 bolero named "Siete notas de amor".

== Early years ==
Alvarado was born in Ponce, Puerto Rico, on October 26, 1920. Nicknamed "Chago", he was the son of the musician Julio Alvarado Tricoche (1886–1970) and Georgina Santos. He had six siblings. He was started into the world of music via his own mother, with whom he sing in public as a duet. In 1939, he was part of the "Tribuna del arte", a WNEL radio program. Winning the first award in that program marked the beginning of his career. This took him to New York City after getting a contract with Chico Club of Greenwich Village.

== Music career ==
In NYC, he joined Celso Vega's quintet, obtaining exposure in the CBS and NBC radio networks. In 1944, he joined the Flores Sextet, led by composer Pedro Flores. He went on his first international tour with this group in 1946. After the breakup of the group, he returned to Puerto Rico and was contracted by WEMB (Radio El Mundo) in 1947.

He returned to NYC and joined Cuarteto Yalí, headed by Félix Rodríguez "Corozo", in 1948. He joined Trío San Juan, marking the beginning of a new stage in his musical career. Trío San Juan was highly regarded in Mexico and Colombia, even better than Trío los Panchos. It was highly regarded in Venezuela, Brazil, Peru and Argentina, in addition to the United States.

The group enjoyed many hits, but none more successful than "Siete notas de amor", which has made the soundtrack of the Mexican movies including "El amor que yo te di" and "La cigüeña dijo sí" (1958), plus "¡Viva Jalisco, que es mi tierra!" (1959). It also enjoyed French, Japanese, Italiano, and English versions.

== Personal life ==
In July 1941, he married Aurora Torres in Ponce, Puerto Rico. The couple had five sons; one, Harry, died of heart disease in August 2015. The union was dissolved at some point. Aurora Torres died in New York City in December 2011.

Alvarado Santos had married Irma Gloria Cedeño in 1977 and they had seven children.

== Later years ==
Chago Alvarado lived his last years in Humacao, where he owned a restaurant and night club called "La Brasa Steak House". He performed there live on the weekends. He died on July 23, 1982, at the age of 61, from kidney disease at the Regional Hospital in Caguas, Puerto Rico.

== See also ==
- List of Puerto Ricans
