= Félix Franco-Oppenheimer =

Puerto Rican poet and writer

- Born: August 10, 1912; Ponce, Puerto Rico
- Died: September 25, 2004; San Juan, Puerto Rico
- Occupations: Poet and writer

Félix Franco-Oppenheimer (August 10, 1912 – September 25, 2004) was a Puerto Rican poet and writer. His works include Contornos, Imagen y visión edénica de Puerto Rico, and Antología poética.

== First years ==
Franco-Oppenheimer was born in Ponce, Puerto Rico in the year of 1912.

== Death ==
He died in San Juan, Puerto Rico, on September 25, 2004 and was buried at Cementerio La Piedad in Río Piedras, Puerto Rico

== Honors ==
Franco-Oppenheimer is honored at Ponce's Park of Illustrious Ponce Citizens for his contributions in the field of literature.

== See also ==
- List of Puerto Ricans
