= Hemeterio Colón Warens =

Puerto Rican educator

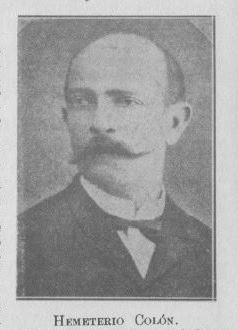
- Hemeterio Colón Warens
- Born: 26 July 1839; Ponce, Puerto Rico
- Died: 20 September 1889 (aged 50); Ponce, Puerto Rico
- Occupations: Farmer, Educator, Land surveyor, and Mayor

Hemeterio Colón Warens (sometimes erroneously spelled "Emeterio Colón Warrens" or "Emeterio Colón Warens"; 1839-1889) was a Puerto Rican educator and mayor of the municipality of Cayey, Puerto Rico.

== Early years ==
Hemeterio Colón Warens was born in Ponce, Puerto Rico, on 26 July 1839, the son of Sebastián Colón and Marcelina Warens.

== Biography ==
Colón Warens was a teacher in San Germán and Humacao. While in Humacao, he founded the newspapers "La Abeja" and "La Juventud". Colon Warens was a supporter of political autonomy for Puerto Rico, and he used his papers to gain sympathizers. He moved to Cayey, where he opened a school and became Mayor there in 1873. He also opened a school in San Lorenzo. Ten years later, in 1883, he founded the Colegio Central Ponceño (Ponce Central School) in Ponce. Colegio Central Ponceño was founded together with Román Baldorioty de Castro and under the authorization of Governor Miguel de la Vega Inclán, and it was a second level school.

== Death, legacy and honors ==
He died in Ponce on 20 September 1889. He was 50 years old. The city of Ponce built a school in 1814 and named it after him. He is also honored at the Park for the Illustrious Ponce Citizens.

== See also ==
- List of Puerto Ricans
