= Vicente Balbás Capó =

Puerto Rican writer

Vicente Balbás Capó (1864–1926) was a Puerto Rican journalist and political figure. He was a defender of the Spanish regime in Puerto Rico, and during the Spanish–American War he organized a volunteer battalion and was imprisoned for his opposition to Puerto Ricans serving in the United States armed forces.

Balbás Capó was born in Ponce, Puerto Rico, in 1864.

== Rejected U.S. citizenship ==
Balbás Capó was among a group of 229 Puerto Ricans who, at the time of the imposition of American citizenship on Puerto Ricans in 1917, campaigned to reject the imposition of American citizenship and protested the American citizenship by failing to register for the American military service as required by Federal law.

== Sentenced to seven years prison ==
Balbás Capó made history again when he was arrested and sentenced to seven years imprisonment for using his newspaper El Heraldo de las Antillas to fight the draft, American citizenship and the americanization of Puerto Rico. He appeals to the First Circuit Court in Boston and wins. He rejected American citizenship.

== Opposed military service ==
During the period of 1917 to 1919, those opposing obligatory military recruitment in Puerto Rico were strongly suppressed. During this period, 1,541 Puerto Ricans were declared delinquents by the Selective Military Service. Of those, over 330 were arrested, of which 229 were jailed for not registering in the U.S. military service. Balbás Capó was among those 229. When his case was heard in U.S. Federal Court in Puerto Rico, he was sentenced to eight years in prison. Upon appeal to the First Circuit Court in Boston, however, he was absolved.

== Death ==
Balbás Capó died in 1926 in San Juan, Puerto Rico. He was buried at Santa María Magdalena de Pazzis Cemetery in San Juan.

== See also ==
- List of Latin American writers
- List of Puerto Rican writers
- List of Puerto Ricans
- Puerto Rican literature
- Multi-Ethnic Literature of the United States
