= Francisco Rosa Rivera =

Puerto Rican body builder and personal trainer

- Born: 19 March 1972; Ponce, Puerto Rico
- Died: 16 February 2010 (aged 37); Caguas, Puerto Rico
- Occupation: Bodybuilder
- Spouse: Paula Díaz
- Children: Adriana Nicole (b. 1998); Mya Paola (b. 2005); Francisco Andrés (b. 2007) and Lya Melisha (b. April 2009)

Francisco Rosa Rivera (19 March 1972 – 16 February 2010) was a Puerto Rican bodybuilder.

== Early years ==
Francisco Rosa Rivera (not to be confused with Francisco Rivera Rosa, the Puerto Rican painter) was born in Ponce, Puerto Rico, on 19 March 1972. Rosa Rivera studied acting ("Actuación Dramática") and received a B.S. degree in Business Administration from the Interamerican University of Puerto Rico. He was a practicing martial arts guru, having achieved a Black Belt in Karate and a First Dan in Tae-Kwon-Do. In 1994, he became a certified personal trainer by the National Strength and Conditioning Association (NSCA).

== Career ==
He was called the "Trainer of Stars" because people like Ricky Martin, Osvaldo Ríos, Melwin Cedeño, Xavier Torres and Angelique Burgos Vidal («La Burbu») trained with him. After receiving his Personal Trainer certification, he established his own personal training gymnasium in Guaynabo, Puerto Rico. During 1998–2000, he also hosted his own TV show named "A fuego, meridiano". He also headed the program Tu mañana, in Univisión Puerto Rico (Channel 11), where he carried two segments, "Francisco en acción" (Mondays) and "Francisco al extremo" (Fridays).

== Family life ==
He was married to Paola Díaz. They had three children: Mya Paola (b. 2005); Francisco Andrés (b. 2007) and Lya Melisha (b. April 2009). And Adriana Nicole (b. 1998) from a previous marriage to Enid González.

== Later years ==
During his later years, Rosa Rivera developed a unique bodybuilding program known as FRANCO (from its abbreviation in Spanish "Fuerza, Resistencia, Agilidad, Nutrición, Compromiso y Organización"; English: Strength, Resistance, Agility, Nutrition, Commitment, and Organization). He also campaigned to include supervised physical exercise in the medical programs for senior citizens and obese children and marketed the sporting fashion line that has its name.

== Death ==
Rosa Rivera died in Caguas on 16 February 2010 a victim of tongue and throat cancer. He had been diagnosed in September 2008.

== See also ==
- List of Puerto Ricans
