= Raúl Gándara Cartagena =

Puerto Rican fire chief (1910–1989)

- Born: 1910; Ponce, Puerto Rico
- Died: 1989; Ponce, Puerto Rico
- Occupation: Puerto Rico Fire Chief

Raúl Gándara Cartagena (1910–1989) was fire chief in Ponce, Puerto Rico, and the first and longest-serving Commonwealth of Puerto Rico fire chief. He served from 1942 to 1972.

== Public service ==
Gándara Cartagena was born in Ponce, Puerto Rico, on 26 March 1910. In 1930, he entered the Ponce Fire Department as Commander. In 1942, the Puerto Rico Legislature created the Servicio de Bomberos de Puerto Rico (Puerto Rico Fire Service), and the governor of the island at the time, Rexford Guy Towell, selected Raúl Gándara—who at the moment was Captain of the Ponce Fire Corps—to become Puerto Rico's first state fire chief. Gandara was Puerto Rico state chief for 30 years, making him the longest-serving state fire chief ever.

=== Bomberos de Ponce ===
The Ponce municipal fire corps (Spanish: Cuerpo de Bomberos Municipales de Ponce) was founded in 1883. Starting in the 1940s, the Commonwealth of Puerto Rico opened and operated a fire corps in Ponce functioning in parallel to the Ponce municipal corps. In 1989 the municipal Cuerpo de Bomberos de Ponce were incorporated into the structure of the state's Cuerpo de Bomberos de Puerto Rico under the concept that Ponce residents would enjoy enhanced services and more modern facilities. By 2011 this promise had either not materialized or fell into disgrace and on 15 May 2012, the city once again re-initiated its own municipal fire corps.

== Firefighter's handbook ==
In 1951, Gandara wrote "Cuerpo de bomberos: Manual del bombero" (Firefighters Corps: A Firefighter's Handbook), a book on the firemen's service, which became a firemen's manual in several Latin American countries.

== Legacy ==
- In Lares, Puerto Rico, (Lares Electoral Precinct 48) there is a street named after Gándara.
- In 1999, the Puerto Rico legislature created the Medalla al Valor Raúl Gándara Cartagena (Raúl Gándara Catagena Valor Medal), that is given to "those firefighters displaying an act of heroism, laying out their lives to protect others."
- Gandara has also been recognized as an outstanding civic leader at Ponce's Park for the Illustrious Ponce Citizens.
- The building housing the headquarters of Bomberos de Puerto Rico is named in his honor.

== See also ==
- List of Puerto Ricans
