= Juan Bigas Moulins =

Puerto Rican businessman

- Born: 15 June 1863; Barcelona, Spain
- Died: 19 June 1934 (aged 71); Ponce, Puerto Rico
- Occupation: businessman

Juan Bigas Moulins (15 June 1863–19 June 1934) was a nineteenth-century Puerto Rican businessman in Ponce, Puerto Rico.

== Early years ==
Born in Barcelona, Spain, Juan Bigas Moulins immigrated to Puerto Rico when he was eight years old. His parents were Francisco Bigas and Margarita Moulins. His father established a bakery in Peñuelas, and by age 12 Bigas Moulins was helping in his father's business.

== Business ==
Upon the death of his father, Bigas Moulins moved the Peñuelas bakery to the corner of Plaza Degetau and Corcordia streets in Ponce, converting it into a flour and dry goods business called "La Catalina". The company operated in the 1920s. It was later moved to calle Estrella in Ponce and named "Las Mercedes", operating as a bakery and soda crackers factory business.

During the 1920s, Bigas Moulins was a domestic producer of soda crackers who sold and advertised his soda crackers under the name "Sport Sodas".

== Family life ==
Bigas Moulins married in Puerto Rico in 1887.

== Legacy ==
In the 1970s, a building was erected on the block formed between Cantera, Estrella, Salud, and Guadalupe streets in Ponce to replace the original Plaza del Mercado de Ponce Isabel II marketplace building. This original structure was located on the block bounded by Atocha, Castillo, Victoria, and Leon streets. The new building was named the Plaza de Mercado de Ponce Juan Bigas Moulins (Juan Bigas Moulins Ponce Marketplace), in honor of Bigas Moulins. It functioned as Ponce's Plaza de Mercado marketplace for some twenty years while the original Plaza de Mercado Isabel II underwent renovations. In addition to having a building – today called Ponce Servicios – named after him, Bigas Moulins is also honored at Ponce's Park of Illustrious Ponce Citizens.

== See also ==
- List of Puerto Ricans
