= Pedro Miguel Caratini =

Puerto Rican baseball player and accountant

- Born: September 29, 1893; Coamo, Puerto Rico
- Died: February 20, 1978; Dominican Republic
- Batted: left Threw: left

MLB debut
- ca. 1900, for the Tigres del Licey

Last MLB appearance
- ca. 1930

Career highlights and awards
- " Dominican baseball"; Puerto Rico Baseball Hall of Fame Inductee; Dominican Baseball Hall of Fame Inductee

Pedro Miguel Caratini y González (September 29, 1893 – February 20, 1978) was a Puerto Rican baseball player and accountant. Born in Coamo, he was active from ca. 1900 to 1930, both as a player, manager, and instructor. He came to the Dominican Republic during the United States Marine Corps occupation of the island, and eventually became manager of Tigres del Licey. He was elected to the Hall of Fame in both Puerto Rico and the Dominican Republic.

Caratini founded the first institute for accountants (Spanish: Peritos Contadores) in the Dominican Republic, his adoptive land, there he raised his family with his wife Maria Luisa Geraldino of Ponce, Puerto Rico; they had three daughters, Josefa Maria (died in 1999), Gloria Ines (died in 2002) and Carmen Luisa (died in 2012), 12 grandchildren, 33 great-grandchildren and so far 7 great-great-grandchildren. He was honored by Dominican president Joaquin Balaguer for his institute for accountants in 1975.

== Legacy ==
Caratini is honored at the Park of Illustrious Ponce Citizens in Tricentennial Park in Ponce, Puerto Rico.

He was also inducted into the "Coamo (Puerto Rico) Sports Hall of Fame" in 1990. In Coamo, its ballpark stadium was also named after him, known as the Pedro M. Caratini Stadium.

He was a World War I veteran who fought for the United States of America.
