= Manuel González Pató =

Puerto Rican educator

- Born: 3 March 1913; Ponce, Puerto Rico
- Died: 10 November 1973; Ponce, Puerto Rico
- Occupation: Educator
- Spouse: Fellita Argüelles
- Children: Pilar Cecilia, Manuel Rafael

Manuel González Pató (3 March 1913 – 10 November 1973) was a Puerto Rican educator, writer, and sportsman.

== Early years ==
González Pató was born in barrio Maragüez, Ponce, Puerto Rico, on 3 March 1913. He was the third of four children. He attended schools in Ponce and graduated from Ponce High School.

== Schooling and career ==
In 1931 he studied agricultural education at the University of Louisiana. While there, he boxed on the college varsity team as a welter weight. In 1937 he worked teaching vocational agriculture in Puerto Rico until 1939. In 1939, he served in the United States Army during World War II, where he reached the rank of second lieutenant.

In 1949 he became physical education teacher at the Ponce High School, where he rose to general supervisor for physical education curriculum within the Puerto Rico Department of Education. In 1953 he entered the teaching staff at the Pontifical Catholic University of Puerto Rico, where he stayed until his death. At the PCUPR he taught track and field athletics, and he coached physical education students into world champions.

He attended the Olympic Games in Los Angeles in 1952 and the Pan American Games in 1954, 1958, and 1959. He was a trainer and chief of athletics at the Central American Games in San Juan in 1966, and a delegate from Puerto Rico to the British community Games in Kingston, Jamaica.

== Writings ==
González Pató wrote several books. His Tratado de la Educación Física y los Deportes Atléticos was used by the O.E.A.

== Family life ==
González Pató married Fellita Argüelles, with whom he had two children: María del Pilar y Manuel Rafael.

== Death ==
González Pató died in Ponce on 10 November 1973.

== Legacy ==
- There is a bust of González Pató at the Student Center of the Universidad Catolica de Puerto Rico.
- The 1975 "Olimpiada Jíbara de la Vivienda" was dedicated to him (1975).
- In Ponce, there is an intermediate school ("middle school") named after him.
- He is recognized at Ponce's Parque de los Ponceños Ilustres in the area of sports.
- The athletic track at the Villa del Carmen residential community in Barrio Playa is named after him.
- In Ponce, he is recognized at the Park for the Illustrious Ponce Citizens.

== See also ==
- List of Puerto Ricans
