= Pedro J. Labarthe =

Puerto Rican writer

- Born: Pedro Juan Labarthe López de Victoria; 21 June 1905; Ponce, Puerto Rico
- Died: March 1966 (aged 60); San Juan, Puerto Rico
- Occupations: Poet; journalist; novelist; essayist

Pedro Juan Labarthe López de Victoria (21 June 1905 – March 1966) was a Puerto Rican poet, journalist, essayist, and novelist.

== Birth place, training and life ==
Pedro Juan Labarthe López de Victoria was born in Ponce, Puerto Rico in 1905. He moved from Puerto Rico to New York City to study at Columbia University as an adult. He earned professional success and embraced the American way of life, and subsequently wrote various books and essays documenting the experiences of the Puerto Rican migration to New York.

== Books ==
The following are books written by Labarthe:

- The Son of Two Nations: The Private Life of a Columbia Student. (1931)
- Antología de Poetas Contemporaneos de Puerto Rico. (1946)
- Mary Smith. (1958)
- Pueblo: Golgota del Espiritu. (1938)

== See also ==
- List of Puerto Ricans
