= Francisco "Paquito" Montaner =

Puerto Rican baseball player

Francisco ("Paquito") Montaner García
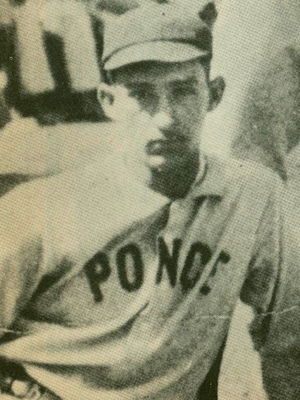
- Born: August 16, 1894; Ponce, Puerto Rico
- Died: April 5, 1945 (aged 50); Ponce, Puerto Rico
- Batted: Right Threw: Right

MLB debut
- 1911, for the Ponce Baseball Club

Last MLB appearance
- 1923

MLB statistics
- First player ever to throw a "no-hitter" in Puerto Rican professional baseball: 22 January 1912

Career highlights and awards
- Pabellón de la Fama del Deporte Puertorriqueño (1955); Galería de Inmortales del Deporte Ponceño (1983)

Francisco ("Paquito") Montaner García (August 16, 1894 – April 5, 1945) was a Puerto Rican pitcher from Ponce. He was the first baseball player to throw a "no-hitter" in Puerto Rican baseball, an event that took place on 10 December 1911. He is honored with the name of one of the largest stadiums in Puerto Rico, the professional baseball league's Francisco Montaner Stadium in Ponce. In 1955, he was inducted into the Puerto Rico Sports Hall of Fame and, in 1983, into the Galeria de los Inmortales del Deporte Ponceño (Ponce's Gallery of the Inmortals of Ponce Sports).

== Early years and schooling ==
Francisco "Paquito" Alfonso Montaner García was born in Ponce, Puerto Rico, on August 16, 1894, to Francisco Montaner Colón and Eugenia García Colón. His parents separated when he was young and Montaner was raised by his mother, together with his other three siblings, Manolo, Mercedes and Amanda. His father was a member of the local chapter of the Unionist party. Montaner García was a graduate of Ponce High School.

== Baseball career ==
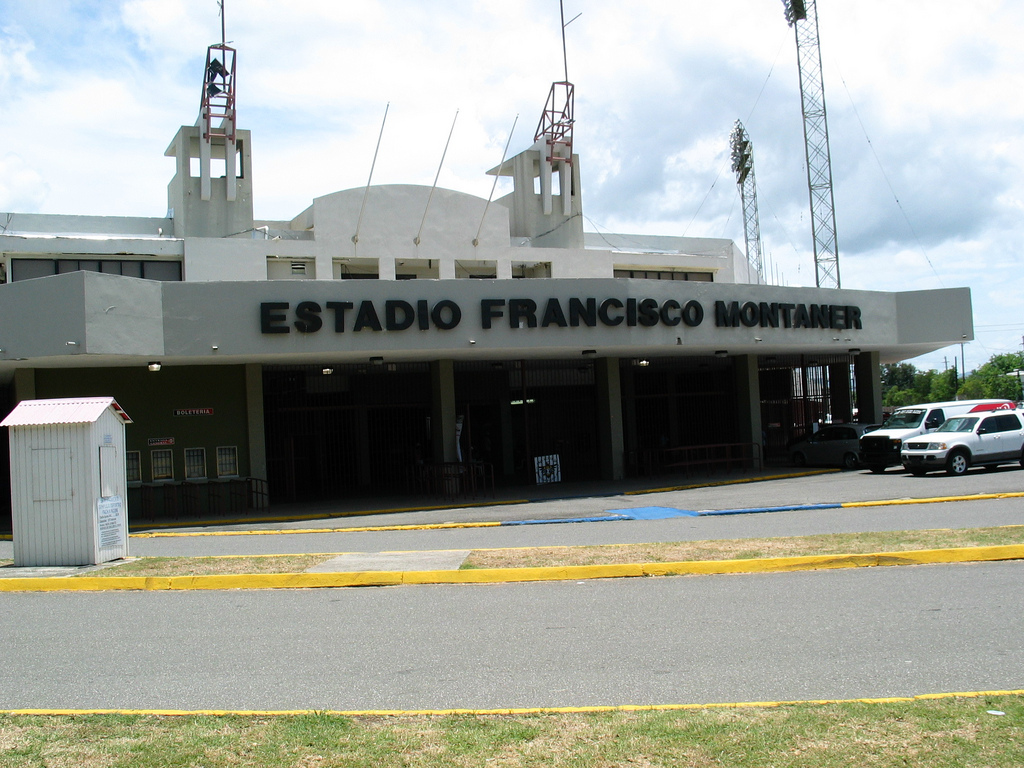
Main entrance to the stadium named after Francisco Montaner

Montaner García predated professional baseball in Puerto Rico, which was not organized until 1926. He was one of the greatest Puerto Rican pitchers of all times. He also played ball performing brilliantly as an infielder. Prior to this, he was responsible for raising the name of his alma mater Ponce High School to the summit of Puerto Rican sports.

On one occasion Montaner García pitched two games on the same day without allowing the opposing team, Santurce's Central High School, to score a single run. On another occasion Montaner scored all strikeouts against 15 batters in succession and, in 1914, Montaner eliminated the All-American team as he threw a no-hitter against a team made up exclusively of American players belonging mostly to major league teams. After this game, the All-American team extended Montaner an offer to play for their team. Montaner's parents refused, however, given that Montaner was still a very young man. "Had the contract materialized, Montaner would have been the first Puerto Rican ever to have played in the major leagues with the New York Yankees, then known as the All-American team". On January 22, 1912, while playing for Ponce's Liga del Castillo, Montaner García threw another no-hitter against San Juan's Capital Pope team. Montaner García was a right-hand pitcher.

Montaner García and his team, the Ponce Baseball Club, played at the Campo Atlético Charles H. Terry located on Calle Lolita Tizol in Ponce. Among the players in his team were Vicente Laborde, Octavio Rodriguez, "Ciqui" Faberlle, Carlos Bonet, Angel Pou, Cayetano Pou, Cosme Beitia, "Pellin" Alicea, Leopoldo Martinez and Lorenzo Roque. Montaner García retired from baseball in 1923 when he hurt his right arm.

== Life outside the diamond ==
=== Shopkeeper ===
As professional leagues had not yet formed in Puerto Rico at the time Montaner played, he made his living outside the baseball field. Montaner García came from a family of shopkeepers. His father, Francisco Montaner Colón (b. 1872- d.?) owned a cigar and liquor shop in Ponce, located near the center of town at the corner of Arenas and Intendente Ramirez streets, in Barrio Sexto (Cantera).

=== Music lover ===
Montaner Garcia loved music and in the 1930s he recorded two 78 rpm records with Jose Piñeiro in New Jersey, United States. The recordings consisted of danzas by Manuel Gregorio Tavárez and Juan Morel Campos. "He loved music, playing the guitar and singing."

=== Family life ===
Montaner García married Sarah Bigay and had four children: Carmen Maria, Francisco (Paquito) (1925–2009), Victor Manuel, and Ausberto (Boty).

== Later years and death ==
Montaner García spent his last few retirement years playing dominoes. He died in Ponce on April 5, 1945, after suffering from leucemia for some time. He was 50 years old at the time of his death. Montaner García was the first major figure in Ponce baseball. His death in 1945 prompted the city of Ponce to honor him by naming the local baseball stadium after him. The stadium broke ground two years after Montaner García's death and opened two years after that, in 1949.

== Legacy ==
- The baseball stadium in Ponce, Puerto Rico, is named after him.
- There is a street near Ponce's Tricentennial Park named after him.
- The centerpiece glass enclosure at Ponce's Museo Francisco Pancho Coimbre is dedicated to him.
- There is a plaque to his memory at Ponce's Park for the Illustrious Ponce Citizens.

== See also ==
- Ponce, Puerto Rico
- List of Puerto Ricans
- Museo Francisco Pancho Coimbre
