= Campo Atlético Charles H. Terry =

Athletic field and baseball park in Ponce, Puerto Rico

Campo Atlético Charles H. Terry (Charles H. Terry Athletic Field)
- "El Charles H. Terry"
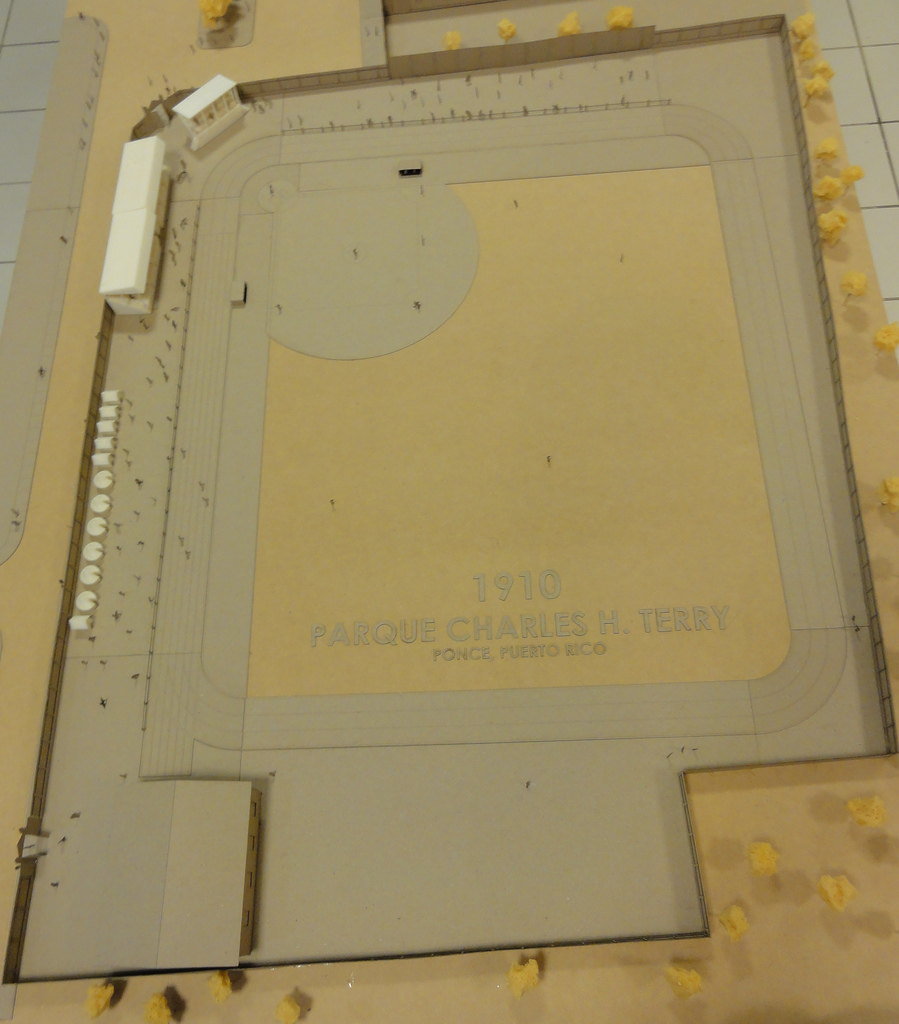
- The 1910 Plan of Charles H. Terry Athletic Field in Barrio Quinto, Ponce, looking north.
- Interactive map of Campo Atlético Charles H. Terry (Charles H. Terry Athletic Field)
- Location: Barrio Quinto, Ponce, Puerto Rico
- Coordinates: 18.013700°N 66.608520°W
- Owner: Municipality of Ponce
- Operator: Municipality of Ponce
- Capacity: Several thousand (approx. maximum)

Construction
- Groundbreaking: 1910
- Opened: 20 November 1910

Campo Atlético Charles H. Terry (English: Charles H. Terry Athletic Field) or, simply, El Charles H. Terry, is the oldest continuously functioning athletic field and baseball park in Puerto Rico, and the second oldest in the Caribbean. The field is located in the city of Ponce and has a capacity of several thousand spectators. It is located next to the Francisco Pancho Coimbre Sports Museum.

== History ==
The Campo Atlético Charles H. Terry was built in 1909 by initiative of then Ponce High School students Cayetano Pou, Rafael Matienzo and Francisco Perez, and the financial backing of Lucas P. Valdivieso and Fernando Luis Toro. The field was initially called La Liga del Castillo for its proximity to the Carcel del Castillo (Castillo Jail) then located just north of it, where Escuela de Bellas Artes de Ponce is located today (2019).

The Charles H. Terry Athletic Field opened in November 1910, in barrio Quinto, in Ponce, Puerto Rico. Its original intended use was to serve as an athletics, sports, and baseball field for students of the new Ponce High School. It was named after one of the first principals of the school, the continental Charles H. Terry, for his effort and dedication in securing the field for use by the students of his school.

Prior to being used as an athletic field for school activities, the area was used for military exercises by the Spanish Military Headquarters adjacent to it. The first official baseball game in Ponce took place in this field in 1899. The first baseball championship in Ponce took place here in 1904 between the local Ponce, Pabst, and Atenas teams.

The American teacher Charles H. Terry, who in 1909 was named superintendent of Ponce public schools, made the arrangements with the United States Army stationed at the old Spanish Military headquarters adjacent to the field to acquire the area where the athletic field would be built. The building of the physical facilities started the same year. Engineers from the Central Guanica sugarcane mill lend technical assistance for the development of the facility. Adrian J. Grief, an officer at Central Guánica, donated the materials for the construction of the field. Volleyball, football, and basketball facilities were operational by 1913.

In 1913-1914 the American "All Stars" baseball team arrived in Ponce and played at Campo Atletico. The teams included players from the Major League Baseball as well as AAA baseball. The 1920s saw the field being used mostly for track and field, basketball and baseball activities.

On 27 February 1930 the daily Aguila de Puerto Rico announces a ceremony to name the field, which so far was called the local playground and Liga del Castillo, as Campo Atletico Charles H. Terry. In 1938 the semi-professional league is created in Puerto Rico and it starts sharing use of Campo Atletico with the professional league. 3 December 1944, registered the first—and only—no hits-no-runs games in Puerto Rican professional baseball. The last game in professional baseball played in Campo Atletico took place on 11 February 1949. After this date games were played at Estadio Francisco Montaner. Likewise, in that year basketball games were moved from the courts at Colegio Ponceño de Varones to the court at Charles H. Terry.

In the 1950s, Campo Atletico is rebuilt considerably. In 1983 the field is converted into Ciudad Deportiva Charles H. Terry. On 21 May 1992, the area beneath the grand stand is converted into a city sports museum, Museo Francisco "Pancho" Coimbre.

== 100th anniversary ==
The celebrations commemorating the 100th anniversary of the park took place on 20 November 2010 at the Francisco "Pancho" Coimbre Sports Museum. The museum is adjacent to the park. As part of the celebrations there was an exposition of photos and sports paraphernalia related to the historic park. There was also a 3-D model of the park produced by the Pontifical Catholic University of Puerto Rico School of Architecture. A documentary film was also incorporated. Participants included players, sports personalities and historians who have witnessed to the historical moments of the park.

== Uses ==
The field is used for the Physical Education activities of several schools in the area, including Ponce High School and the Rafael Pujals Middle School, located immediately across the street from the park.

== See also ==
- Ponce High School
