= Cuarto, Ponce, Puerto Rico =

Barrio of Puerto Rico

Cuarto
- Barrio
- Location of barrio Cuarto within the municipality of Ponce shown in red

- Location of Puerto Rico
- Coordinates: 18°00′27″N 66°36′39″W
- Commonwealth: Puerto Rico
- Municipality: Ponce

Area
  - Total: 0.17 sq mi (0.44 km^{2})
  - Land: 0.17 sq mi (0.44 km^{2})
  - Water: 0 sq mi (0 km^{2})
- Elevation: 43 ft (13 m)

Population (2010)
  - Total: 1,999
  - Density: 12,493.8/sq mi (4,823.9/km^{2})
- Source: 2010 Census
- Time zone: UTC−4 (AST)

Cuarto (Barrio Cuarto) is one of the 31 barrios of the municipality of Ponce, Puerto Rico. Together with Primero, Segundo, Tercero, Quinto, and Sexto, Cuarto is one of the municipality's six core urban barrios. It was created in 1878.

== Location ==
Cuarto is an urban barrio located in the southern section of the municipality, within the Ponce city limits, and southeast of the traditional center of the city, Plaza Las Delicias.

== Boundaries ==
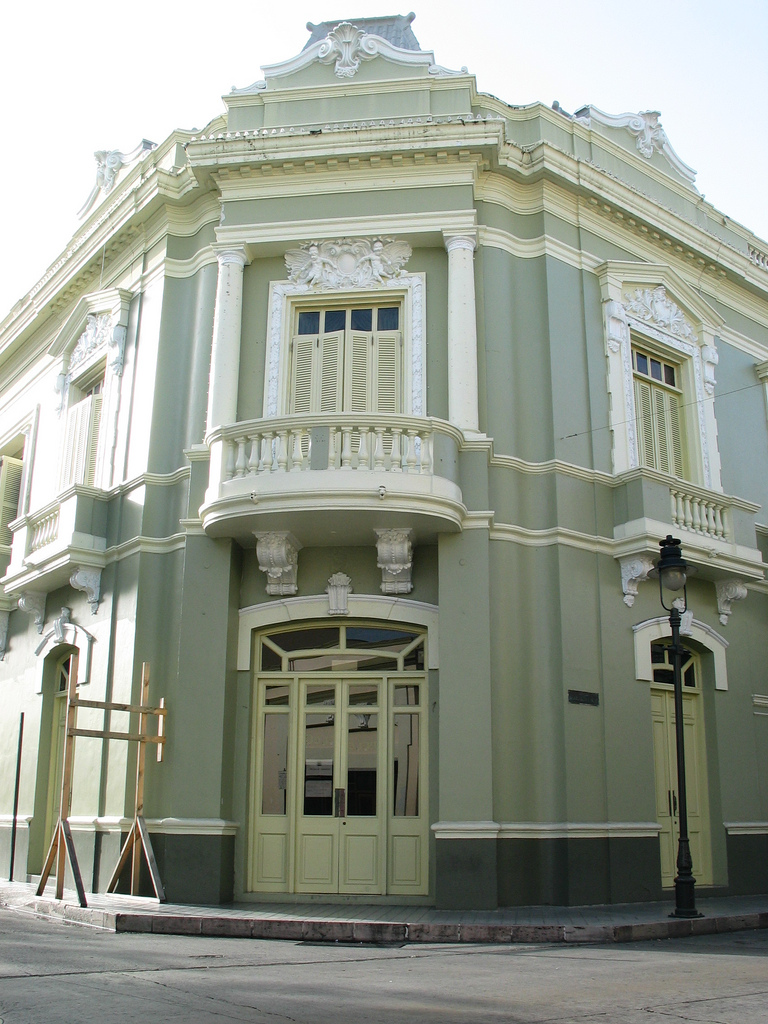
Casino de Ponce, an important historic landmark, is located in Barrio Cuarto.

It is bounded on the North by Comercio/Francisco Parra Duperón Street, on the South by Ramón Power Street, on the West by Eugenio Maria de Hostos Avenue and Marina Streets, and on the East by Rio Portugues. In terms of barrio-to-barrio boundaries, Cuarto is bounded in the North by Barrio Tercero, in the South by Canas Urbano, in the West by Primero, and in the East by San Antón.

== Features and demographics ==
Cuarto has 0.2 square miles (520,000 m^{2}) of land area and no water area. In 2000, the population of Cuarto was 3,011. The population density in Cuarto was 18,303 persons per square mile.

In 2010, the population of Cuarto was 1,999 persons, and it had a density of 12493.8 persons per square mile.

The communities of Belgica and El Bosque are found in Barrio Cuarto as are several other smaller communities.

Historical population
Census	Pop.	Note	%±
1900	3,364		—
1910	3,730		10.9%
1920	5,585		49.7%
1930	8,090		44.9%
1940	8,142		0.6%
1950	7,775		−4.5%
1960	6,332		−18.6%
1970	5,048		−20.3%
1980	3,428		−32.1%
1990	2,763		−19.4%
2000	3,011		9.0%
2010	1,999		−33.6%
U.S. Decennial Census; 1899 (shown as 1900) 1910-1930; 1930-1950 1960 1980-2000 2010

== Landmarks ==
Cuarto is home to Parque de la Abolicion on its southwestern edge. The NRHP-listed Casa Paoli, Old Ponce Casino, Ponce Massacre Museum, and Iglesia de la Santísima Trinidad are all located in Barrio Cuarto. The Puerto Rico Islamic Center at Ponce (see side photo) is also located in Barrio Cuarto.

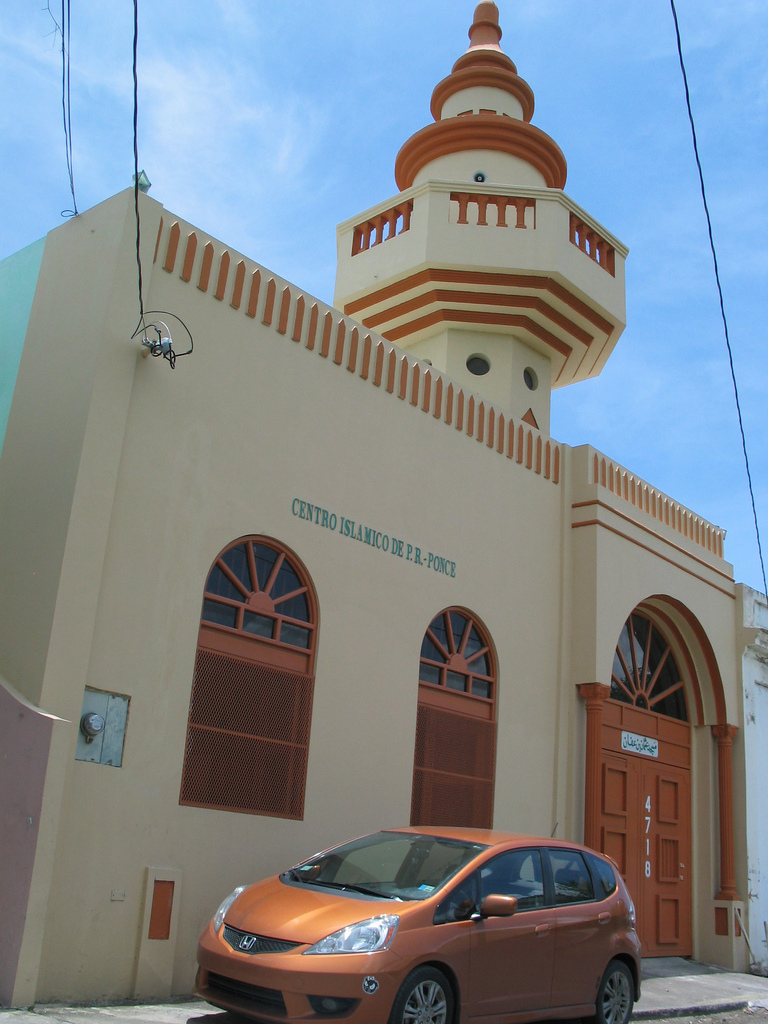
Puerto Rico Islamic Center at Ponce on Luna Street, Barrio Cuarto, a few blocks from downtown

== Notable people from Barrio Cuarto ==
- Domingo Marrero Navarro, educator, writer, and speaker from the Belgica sector of Barrio Cuarto.
- Ruth Fernández, internationally known contralto singer from the Belgica sector of Barrio Cuarto.

== Gallery ==
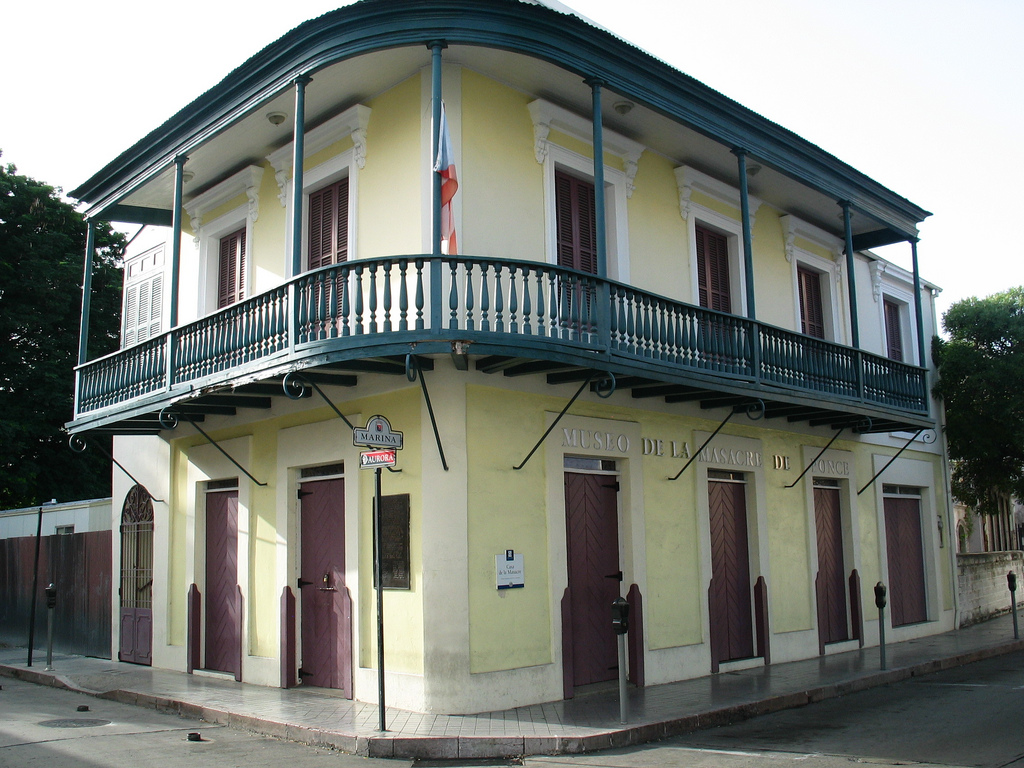
Human rights museum Museo de la Masacre de Ponce on Calle Marina

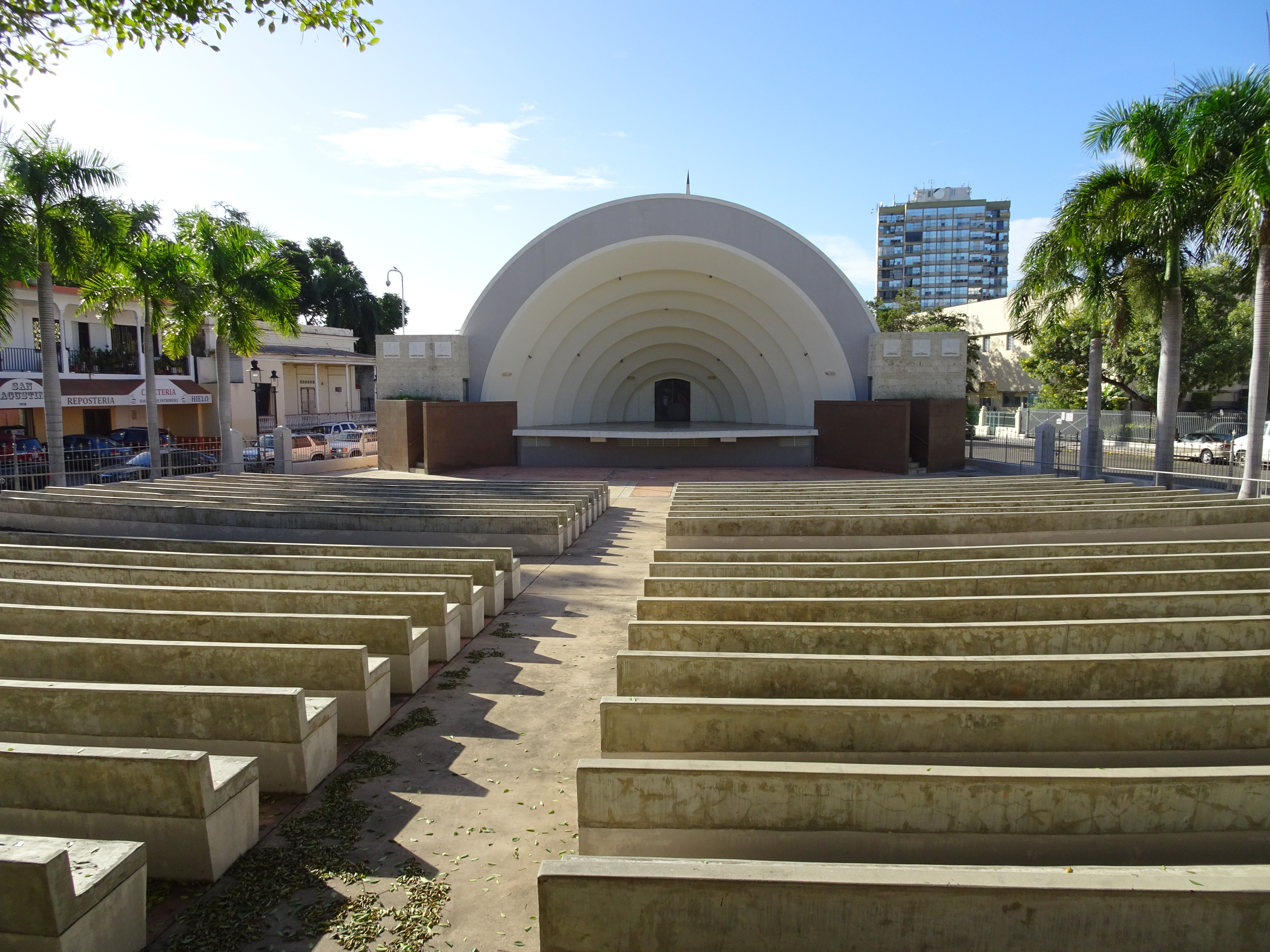
Open-air amphitheater on Calle Marina and Calle Mayor

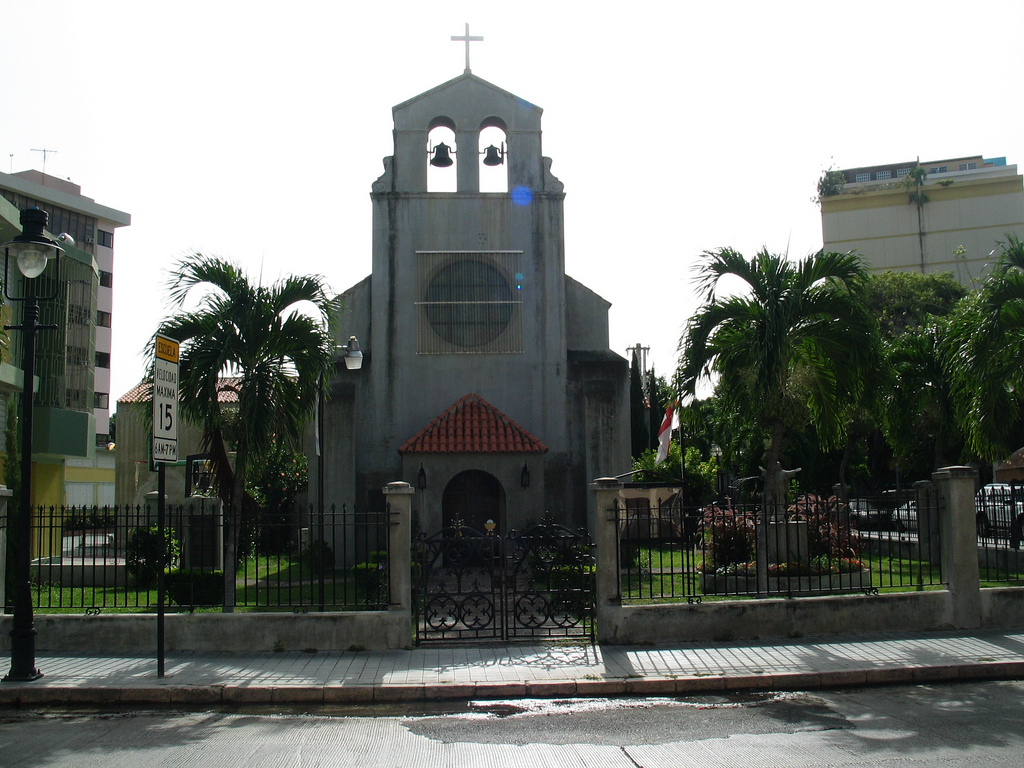
The first (1873) Protestant church in Latin America, on Calle Marina

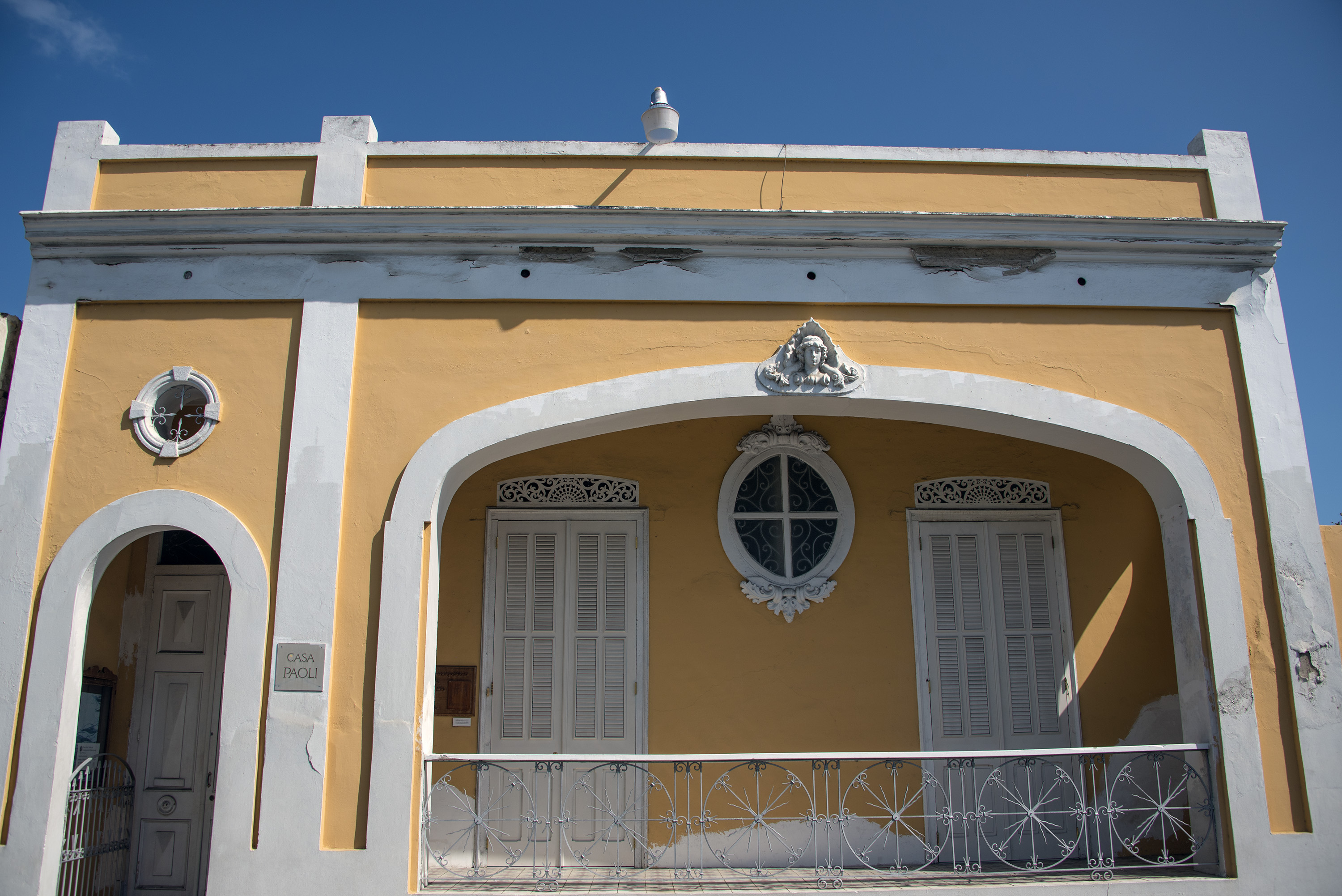
Home of 'The king of tenors', Antonio Paoli, on Calle Mayor

== See also ==
- List of communities in Puerto Rico
