= Primero, Ponce, Puerto Rico =

Barrio of Puerto Rico

Primero
- Barrio
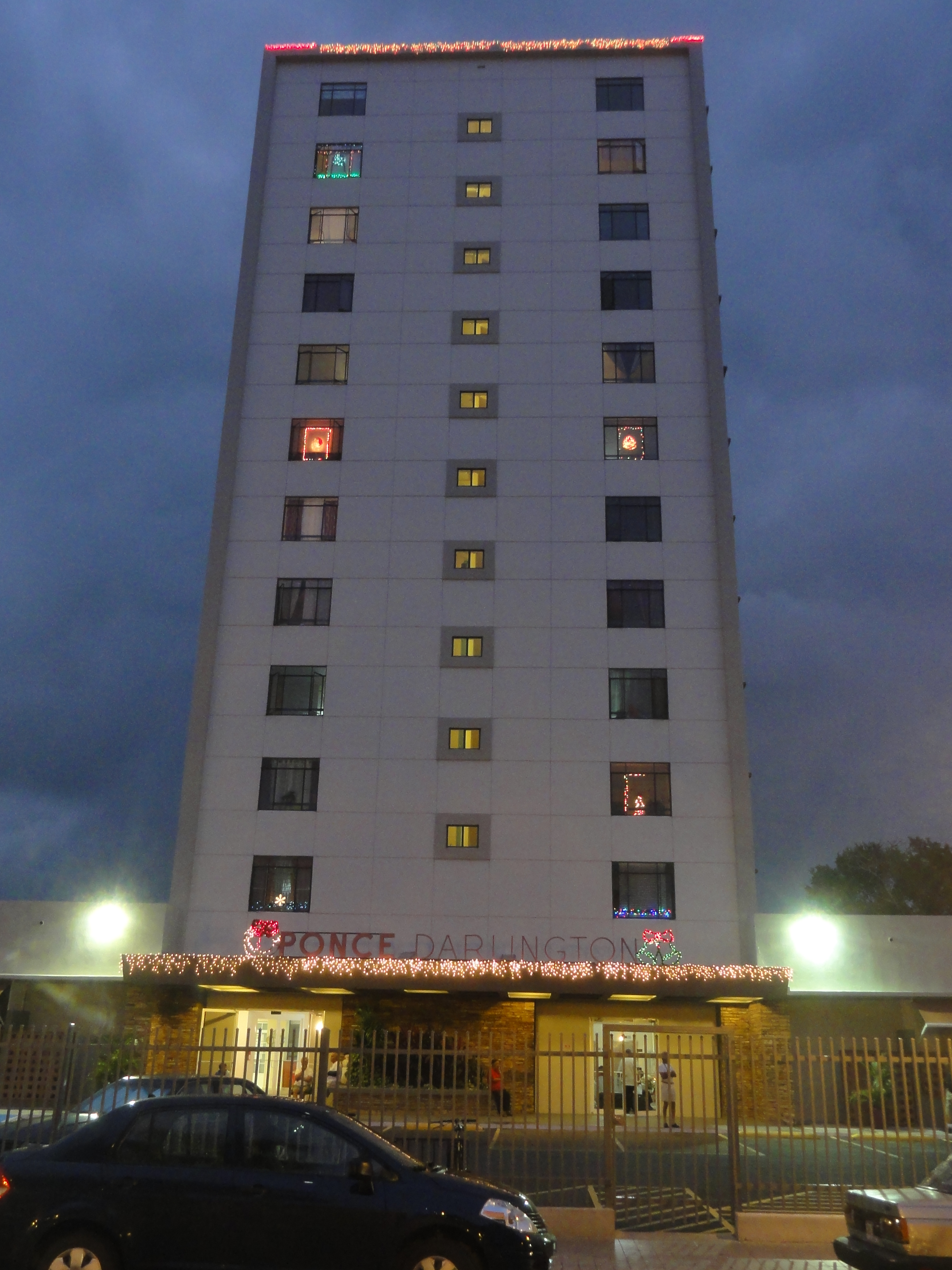
- Ponce Darlington Building, (Barrio Primero, Ponce, Puerto Rico) Ponce's first multi-story building, built in 1962, and former home of WRIK-TV.

- Location of barrio Primero within the municipality of Ponce shown in red

- Location of Puerto Rico
- Coordinates: 18°00′29″N 66°37′10″W
- Commonwealth: Puerto Rico
- Municipality: Ponce

Area
  - Total: 0.26 sq mi (0.67 km^{2})
  - Land: 0.26 sq mi (0.67 km^{2})
  - Water: 0 sq mi (0 km^{2})
- Elevation: 33 ft (10 m)

Population (2010)
  - Total: 3,175
  - Density: 12,211.5/sq mi (4,714.9/km^{2})
- Source: 2010 Census
- Time zone: UTC−4 (AST)

Primero (Barrio Primero) is one of the 31 barrios of the municipality of Ponce, Puerto Rico. Together with Segundo, Tercero, Cuarto, Quinto, and Sexto, Primero is one of the municipality's original six core urban barrios. It was founded in 1878.

== Location ==
Primero is an urban barrio located in the southern section of the municipality, within the Ponce city limits, and southwest of the traditional center of the city, Plaza Las Delicias.

== Boundaries ==
Barrio Primero is bounded on the North by Villa Street, on the South by Ferrocarril and Dr. Ferran Streets, on the West by PR-2R (Carretera Pámpanos / Calle Coto Canas), and on the East by Eugenio Maria de Hostos Avenue and Marina Street.

In terms of barrio-to-barrio boundaries, Primero is bounded in the North by Barrio Segundo, in the South by Canas Urbano, in the West by Barrio Canas Urbano, and in the East by Barrio Cuarto. The communities of Ponce de Leon, Los Maestros, Mariani, and Pedro J. Rosaly are located in Barrio Primero.

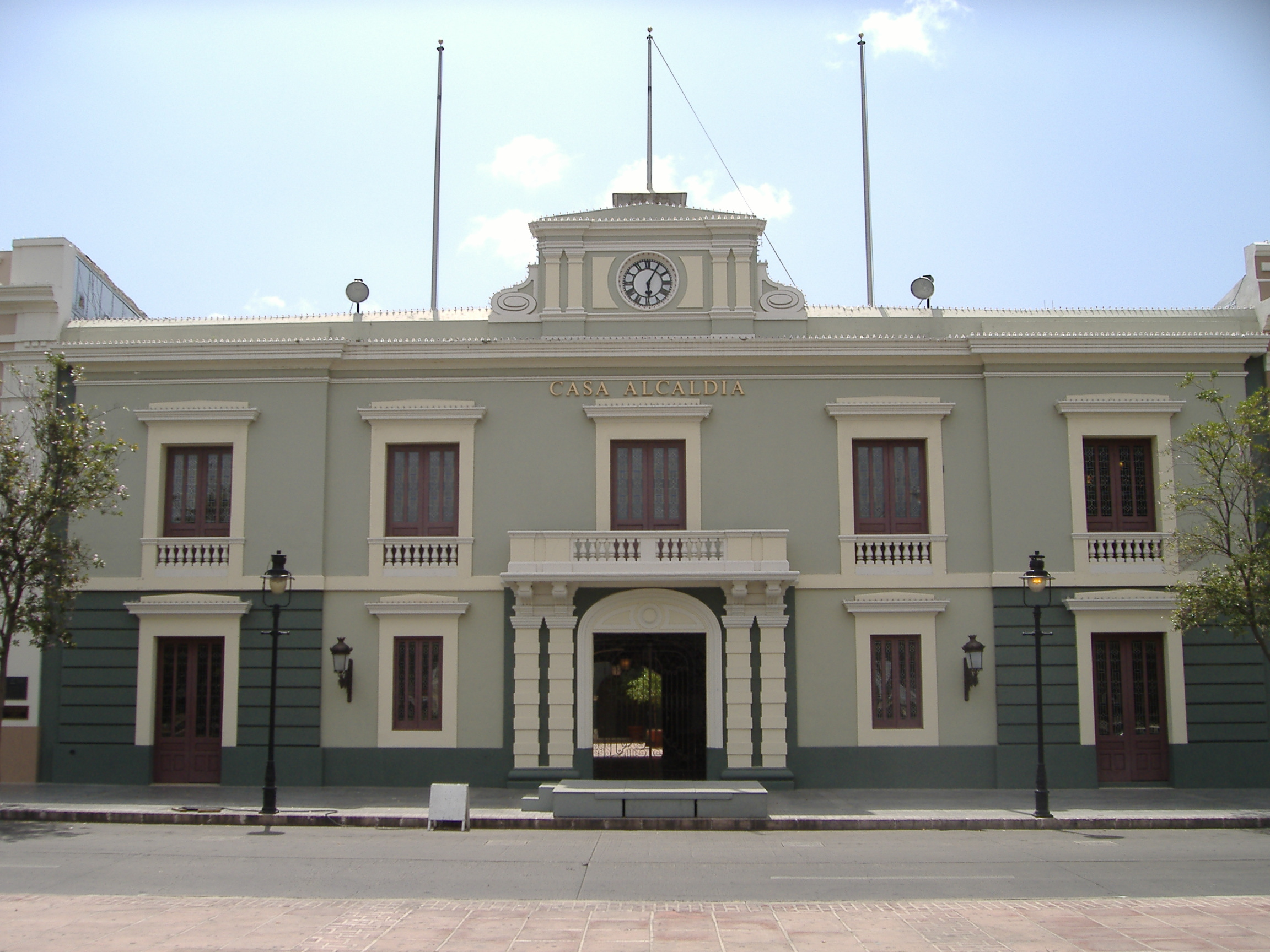
The Ponce City Hall, the oldest colonial building in the city, is located in Barrio Primero.

== Features and demographics ==
Primero has 0.25 square miles (650,000 m^{2}) of land area and no water area. In 2000, the population of Primero was 3,550. The population density in Primero was 13,997 persons per square mile.

In 2010, the population of Primero was 3,175 persons, and it had a density of 12,211.5 persons per square mile.

Historical population
Census	Pop.	Note	%±
1900	1,592		—
1910	2,385		49.8%
1920	2,658		11.4%
1930	3,703		39.3%
1940	4,846		30.9%
1950	6,279		29.6%
1960	5,768		−8.1%
1970	5,289		−8.3%
1980	4,093		−22.6%
1990	3,905		−4.6%
2000	3,550		−9.1%
2010	3,175		−10.6%
U.S. Decennial Census; 1899 (shown as 1900) 1910-1930; 1930-1950 1960 1980-2000 2010

== Notable landmarks ==
Primero is home to Ponce City Hall on its northeastern end. The Dora Colón Clavell Urban Park, is also found in Barrio Primero. The historic, NRHP-listed, Rosaly-Batiz House, Residencia Zaldo de Nebot on 27 Marina Street, and the Missionary Society of the Methodist Episcopal Church on 132 Villa Street, are also in Barrio Primero.

== Gallery ==
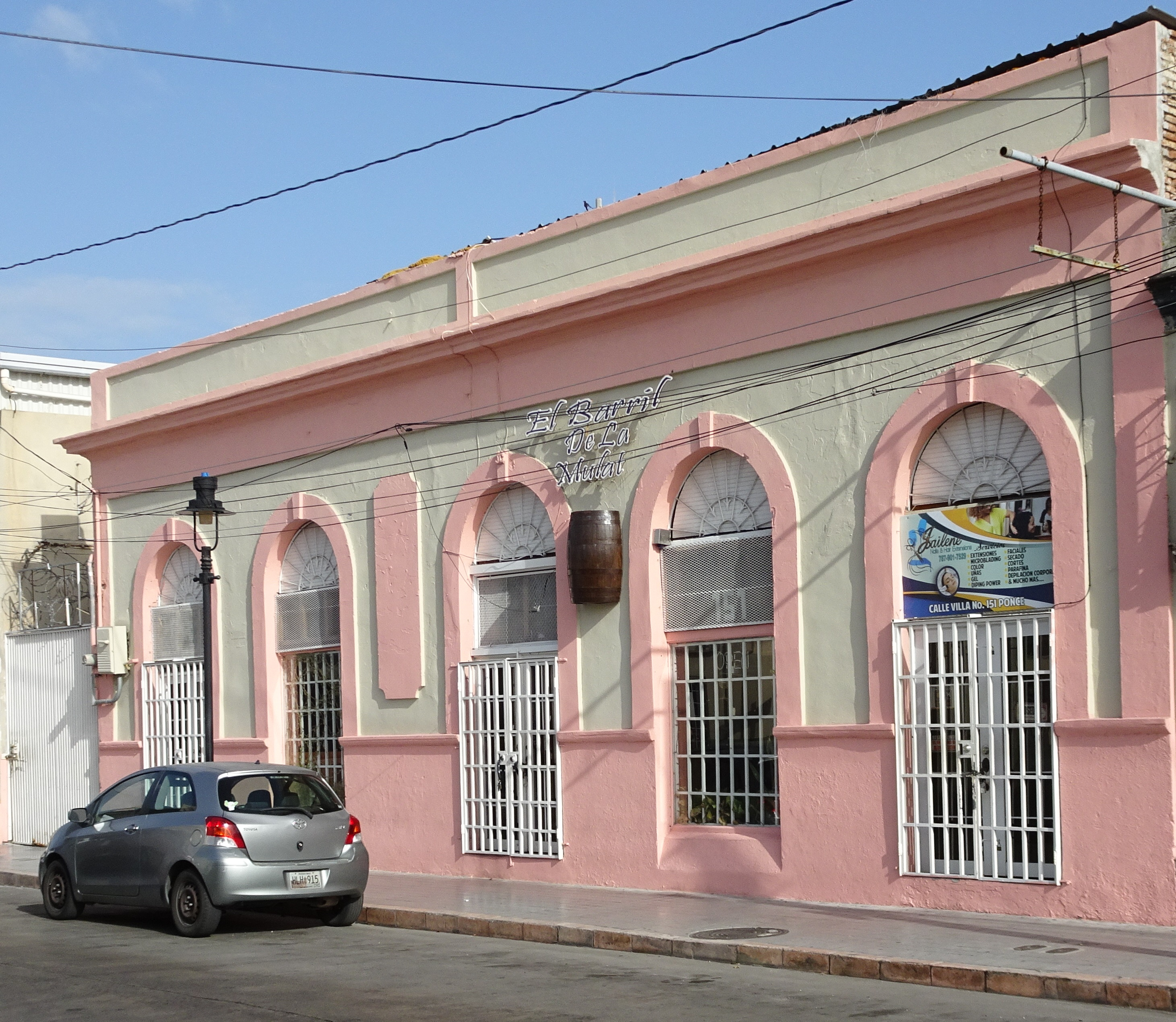
Puerto Rican 'Criollo' food restaurant on Calle Villa and Calle Molina

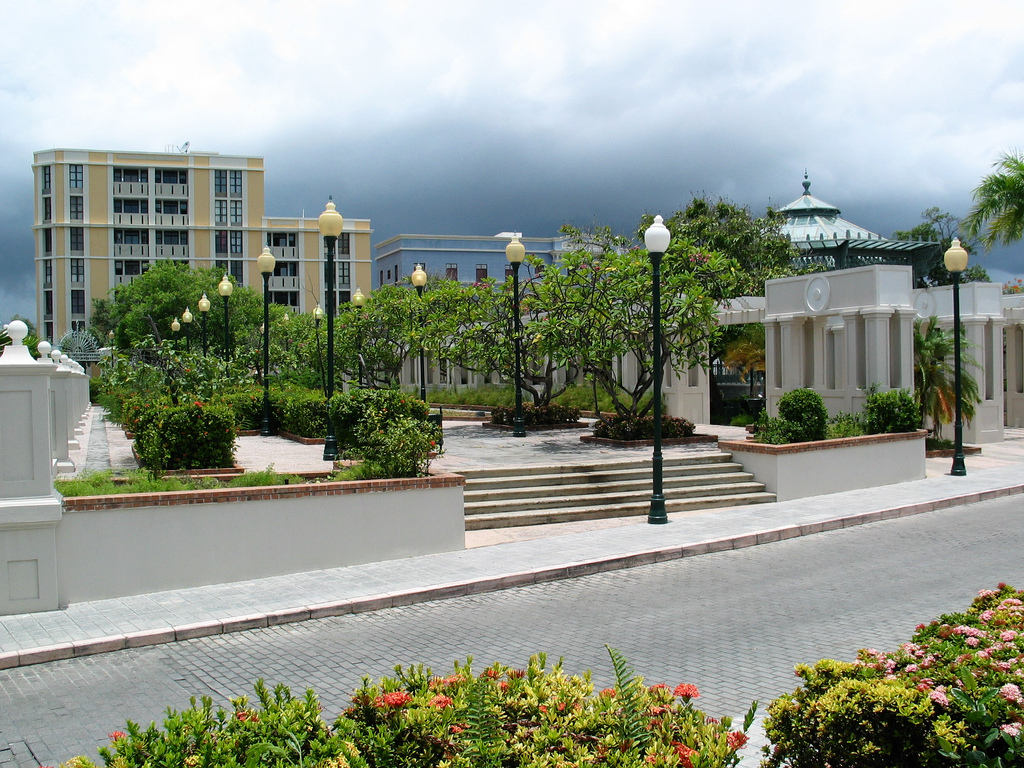
Urban Park on Calle Concordia and Calle Marina

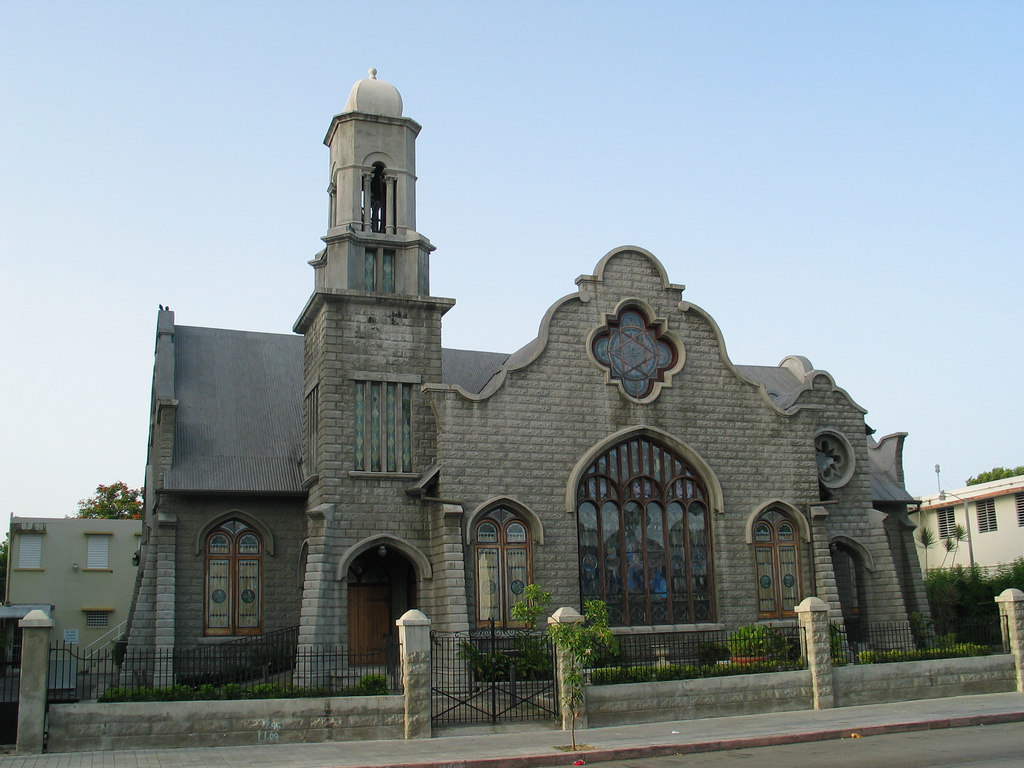
Historic church on Calle Villa, near Calle Torre

== See also ==
- List of communities in Puerto Rico
