= Tercero, Ponce, Puerto Rico =

Barrio of Puerto Rico

Tercero
- Barrio
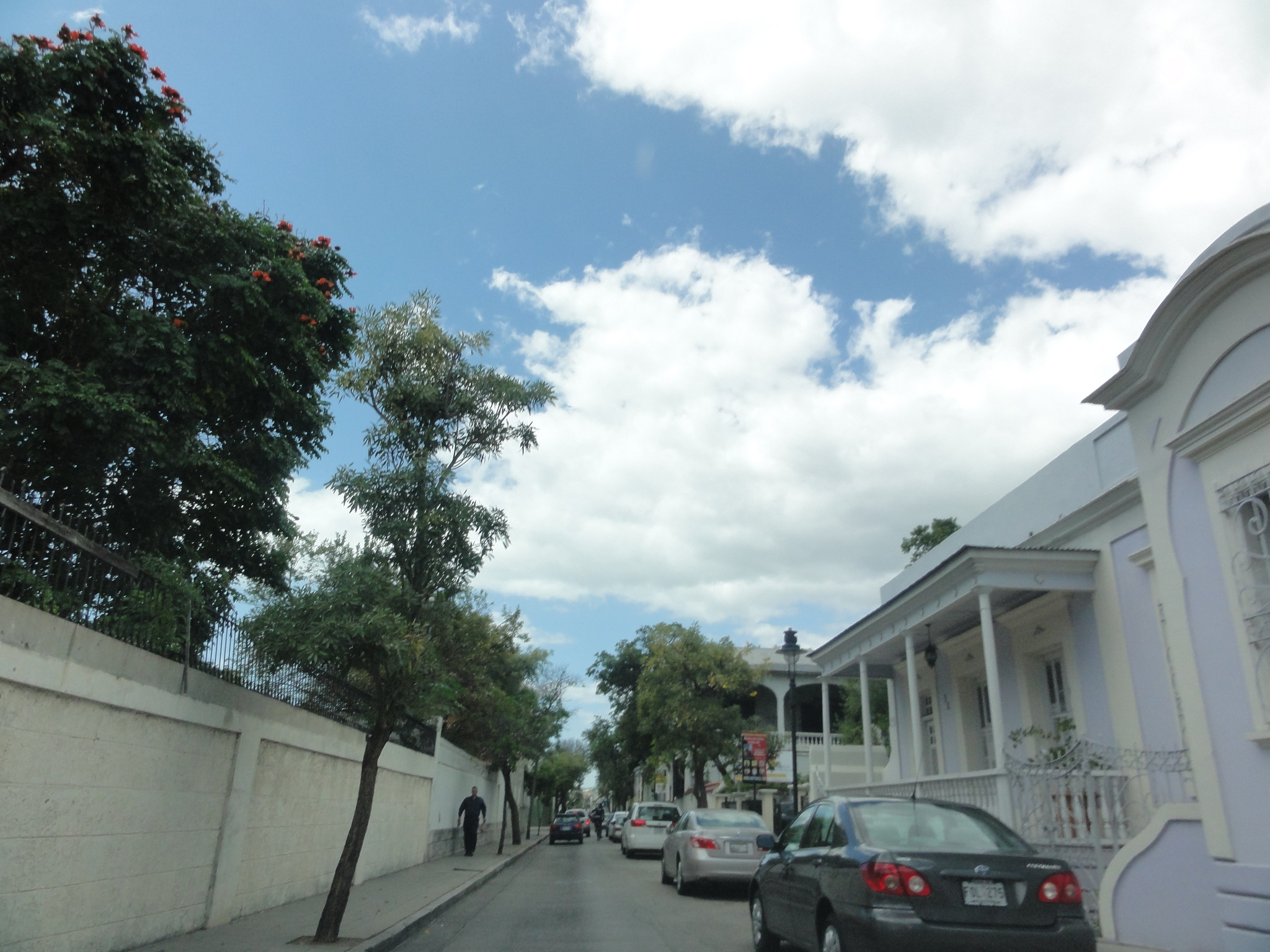
- Typical street in Barrio Tercero (showing Calle Isabel, looking west)

- Location of barrio Tercero within the municipality of Ponce shown in red

- Location of Puerto Rico
- Coordinates: 18°00′40″N 66°36′36″W
- Commonwealth: Puerto Rico
- Municipality: Ponce

Area
  - Total: 0.08 sq mi (0.21 km^{2})
  - Land: 0.08 sq mi (0.21 km^{2})
  - Water: 0 sq mi (0 km^{2})
- Elevation: 52 ft (16 m)

Population (2010)
  - Total: 668
  - Density: 8,350/sq mi (3,220/km^{2})
- Source: 2010 Census
- Time zone: UTC−4 (AST)

Tercero (Barrio Tercero) is one of the 31 barrios of the municipality of Ponce, Puerto Rico. Together with Primero, Segundo, Cuarto, Quinto, and Sexto, Tercero is one of the municipality's six core urban barrios. It was organized in 1878.

== Location ==
Tercero is an urban barrio located in the southern section of the municipality, within the Ponce city limits, and east of the traditional center of the city, Plaza Las Delicias.

== Boundaries ==
External audio
- You may see a video of Barrio Tercero HERE

Barrio Tercero is bounded on the North by Isabel Street, on the South by Comercio/Francisco Parra Duperón Street, on the West by Plaza Degetau and Plaza Munoz Rivera Streets, and on the East by Rio Portugues.

In terms of barrio-to-barrio boundaries, Tercero is bounded in the North by Barrio Quinto, in the South by Cuarto, in the West by Segundo, and in the East by Machuelo Abajo and San Antón.

== Features and demographics ==
In 2000, Tercero had 0.1 square miles (260,000 m^{2}) of land area and no water area. The population of Tercero was 773. The population density in Tercero was 10,134 persons per square mile.

In 2010, it had 0.08 square miles (210,000 m^{2}) of land area and no water area. Its population was 668 persons, and it had a density of 8,350 persons per square mile.

Historical population
Census	Pop.	Note	%±
1900	1,808		—
1910	1,563		−13.6%
1920	1,362		−12.9%
1930	1,138		−16.4%
1940	1,156		1.6%
1950	1,733		49.9%
1960	1,573		−9.2%
1970	1,338		−14.9%
1980	1,096		−18.1%
1990	970		−11.5%
2000	773		−20.3%
2010	668		−13.6%
U.S. Decennial Census; 1899 (shown as 1900) 1910-1930; 1930-1950 1960 1980-2000 2010

== Notable landmarks ==
Tercero is home to many city landmarks. The Antonio Arias Ventura promenade, Ponce History Museum, Tricentennial Park, Teatro La Perla, and the Museum of Puerto Rican Music are all located in Barrio Tercero. Also, the NRHP-listed Banco de Ponce, Ponce High School, Banco Crédito y Ahorro Ponceño, and Salazar-Candal House are found in Barrio Tercero as well.

== Gallery ==
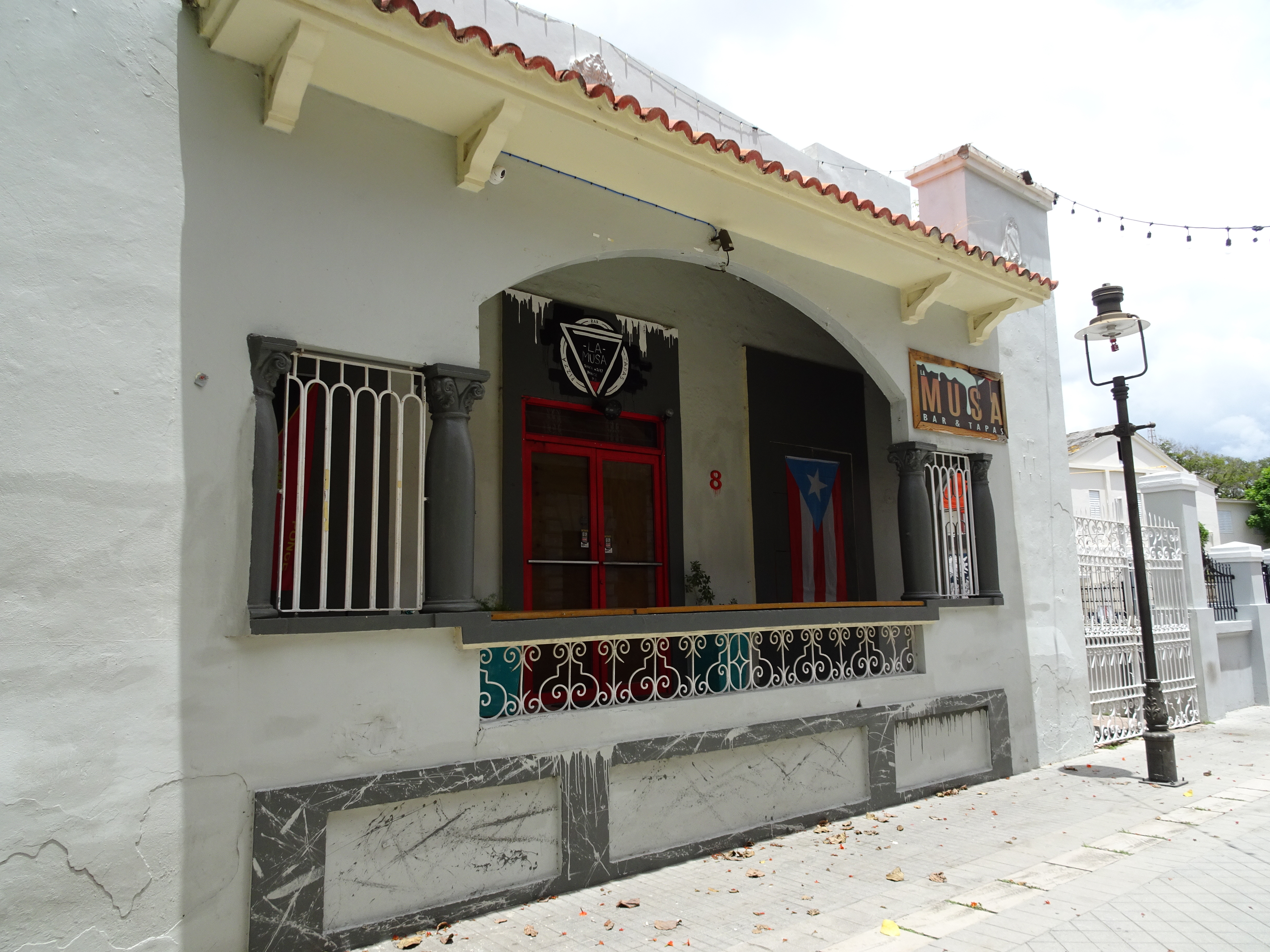
Cosmopolitan bar on Callejón Amor

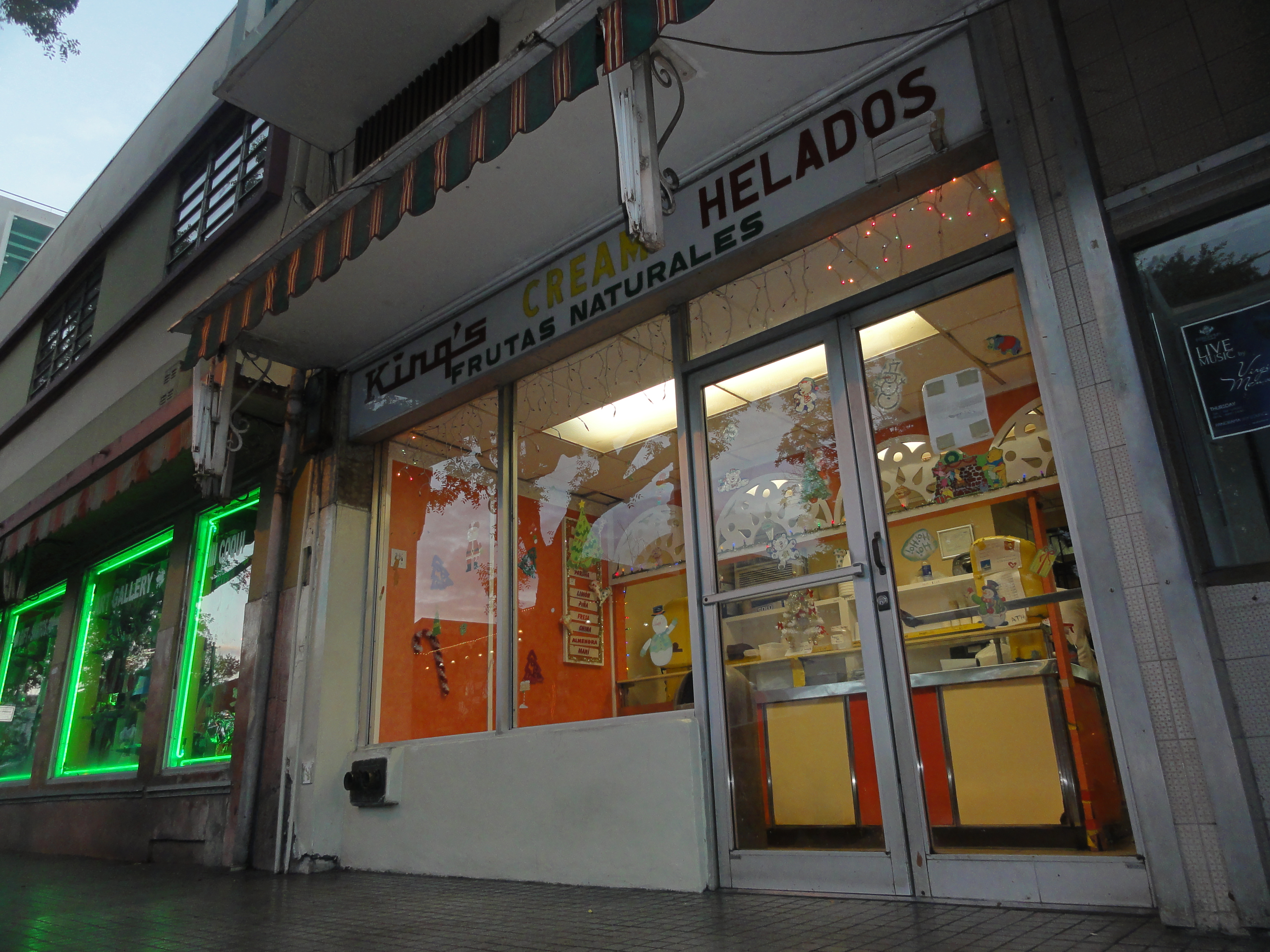
Los Chinos de Ponce ice cream parlor on Calle Marina, Plaza Las Delicias

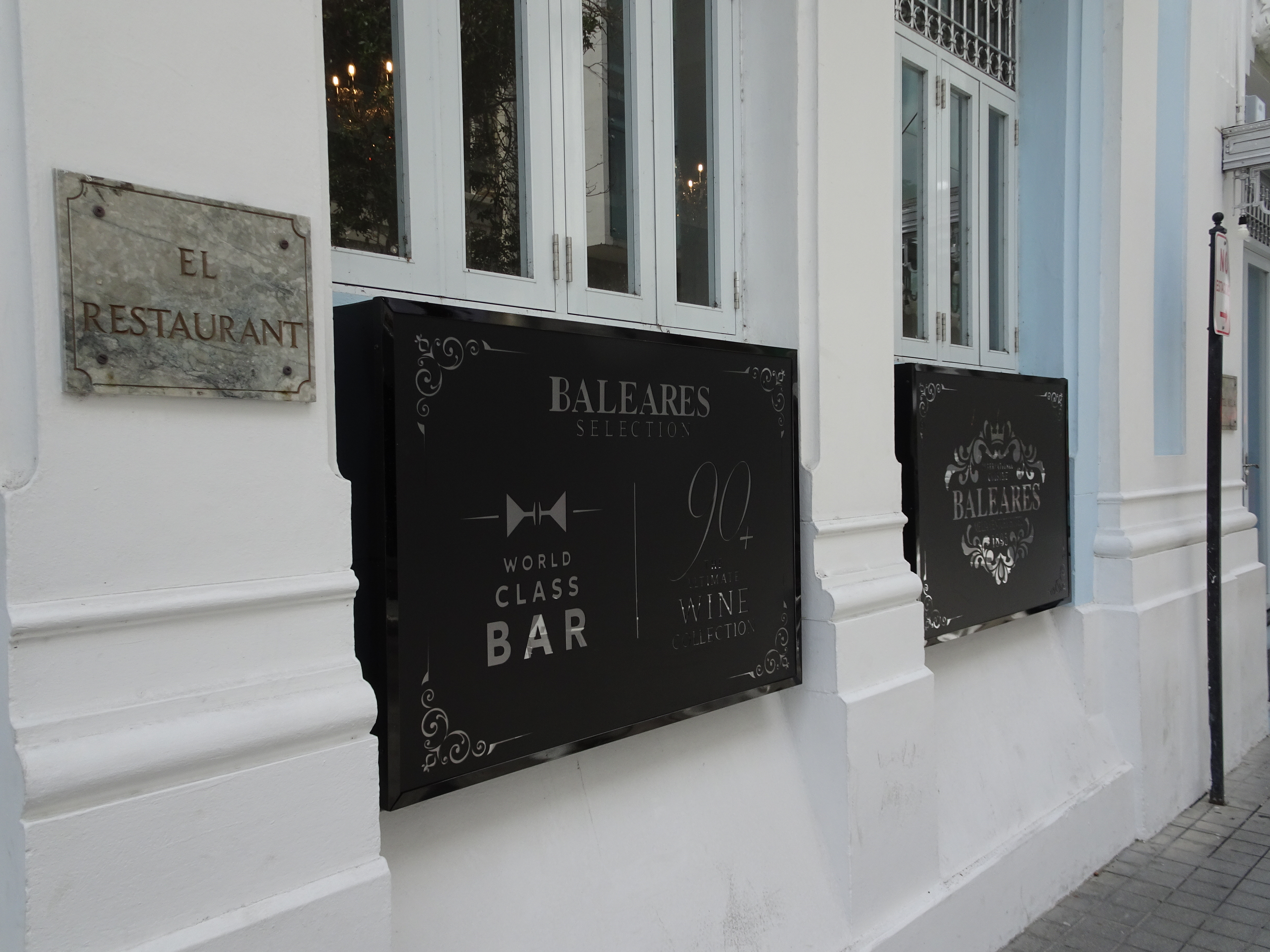
Hotel Melia bar on Calle Cristina

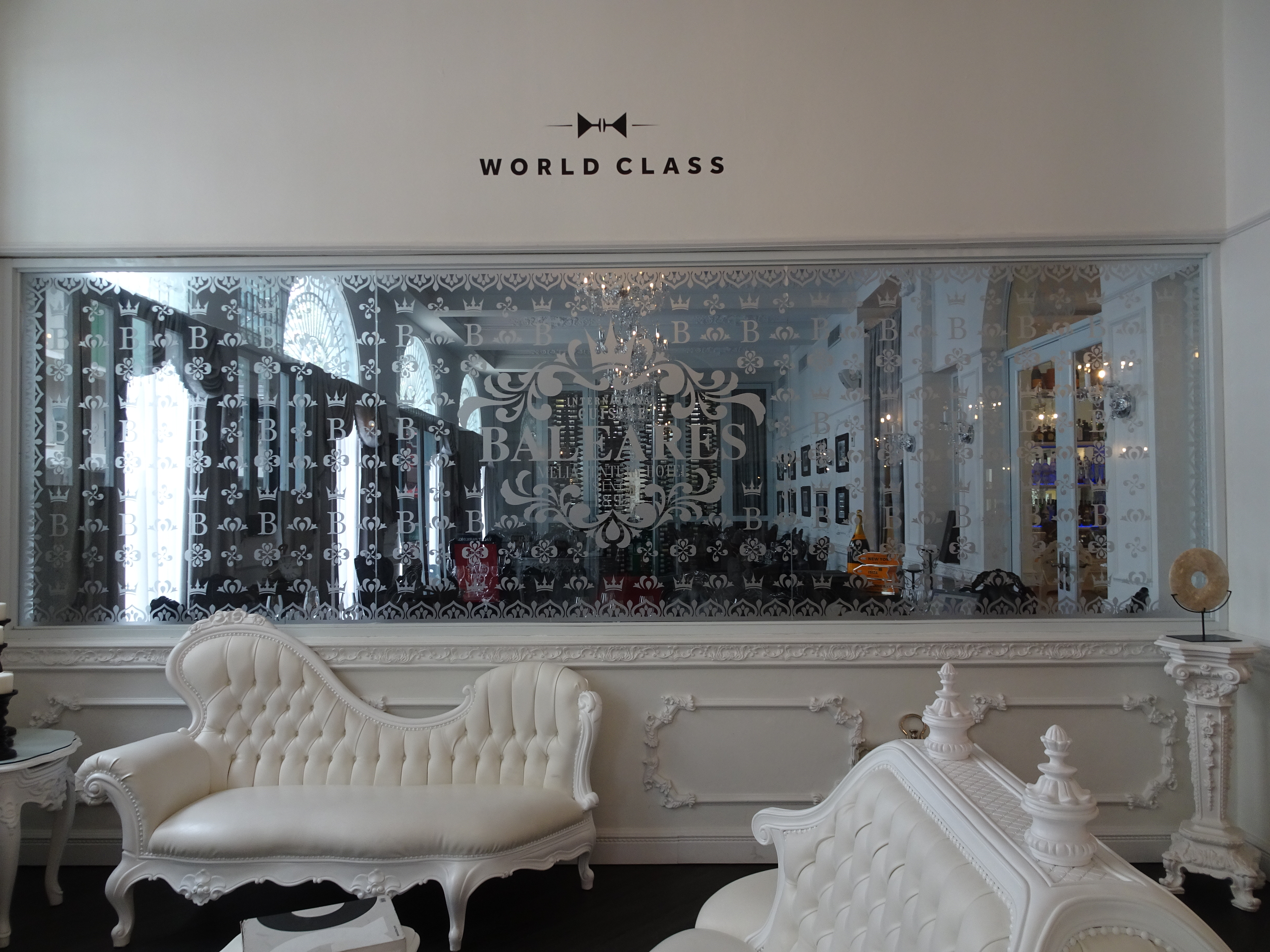
International food restaurant at Hotel Melia, Calle Cristina

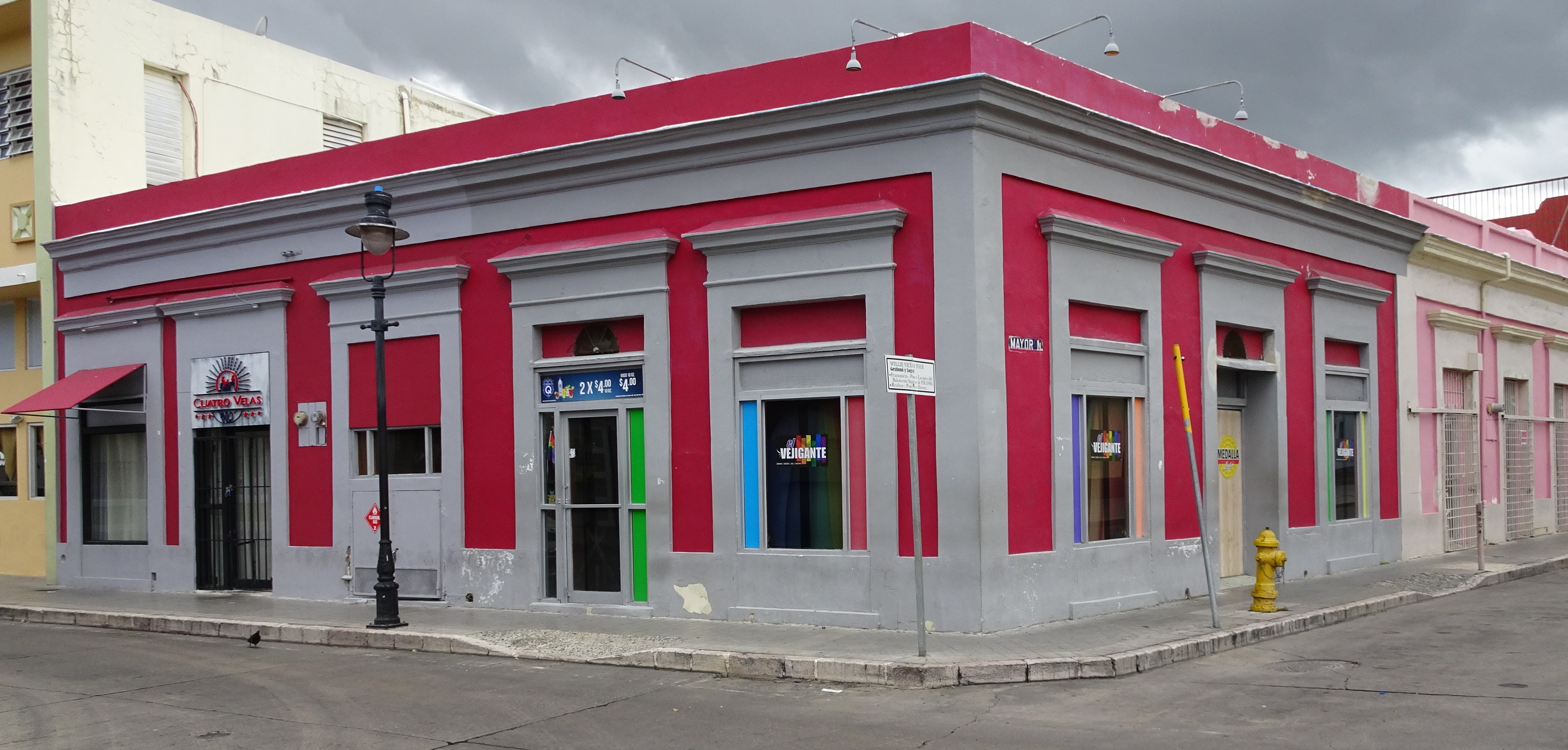
Puerto Rican 'Criollo' food restaurant on Calle Cristina and Calle Mayor

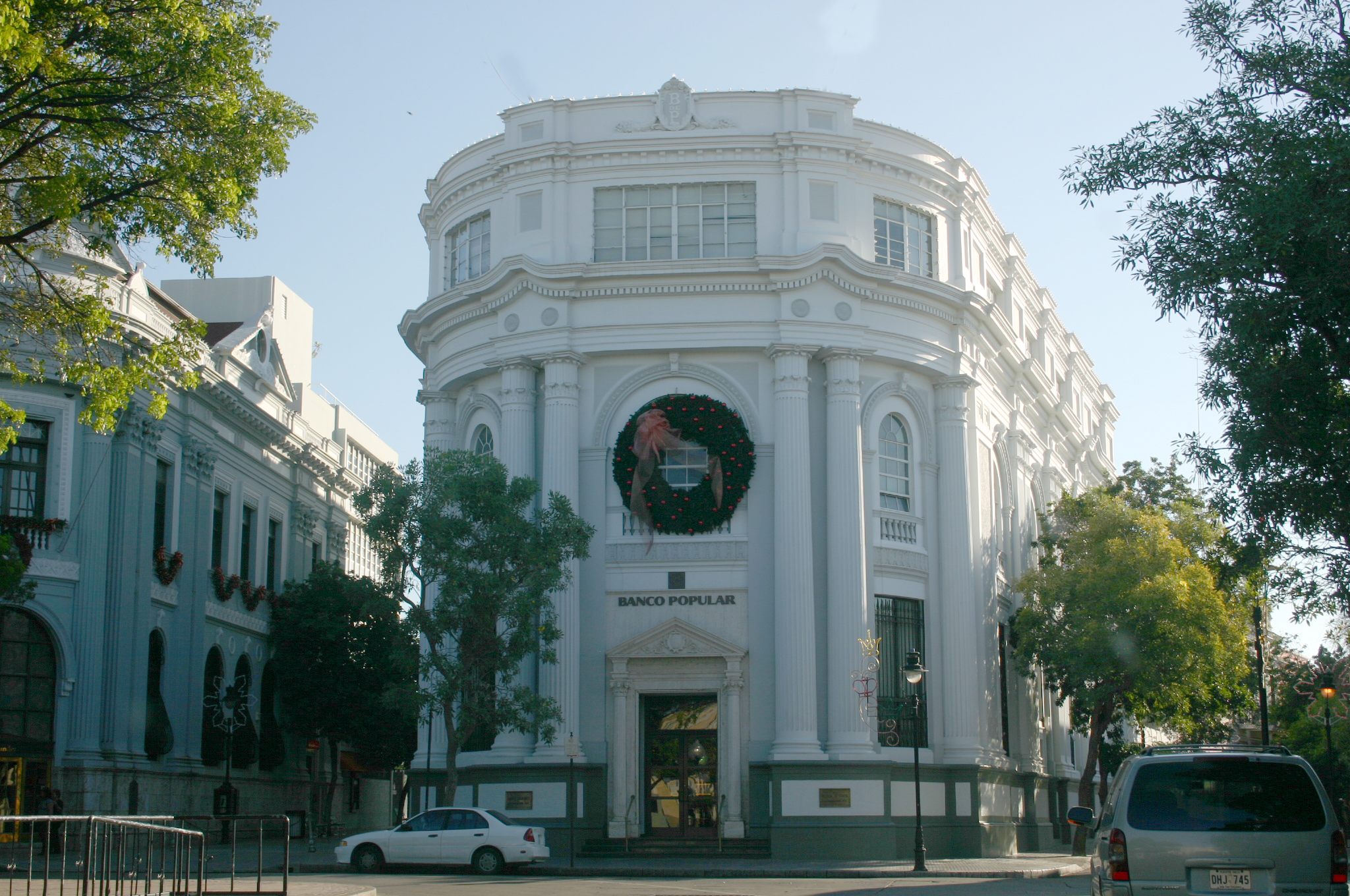
Historic Banco de Ponce building on Calle Marina and Calle Comercio

== See also ==
- List of communities in Puerto Rico
