= Ponce High School =

Historic building in Ponce, Puerto Rico

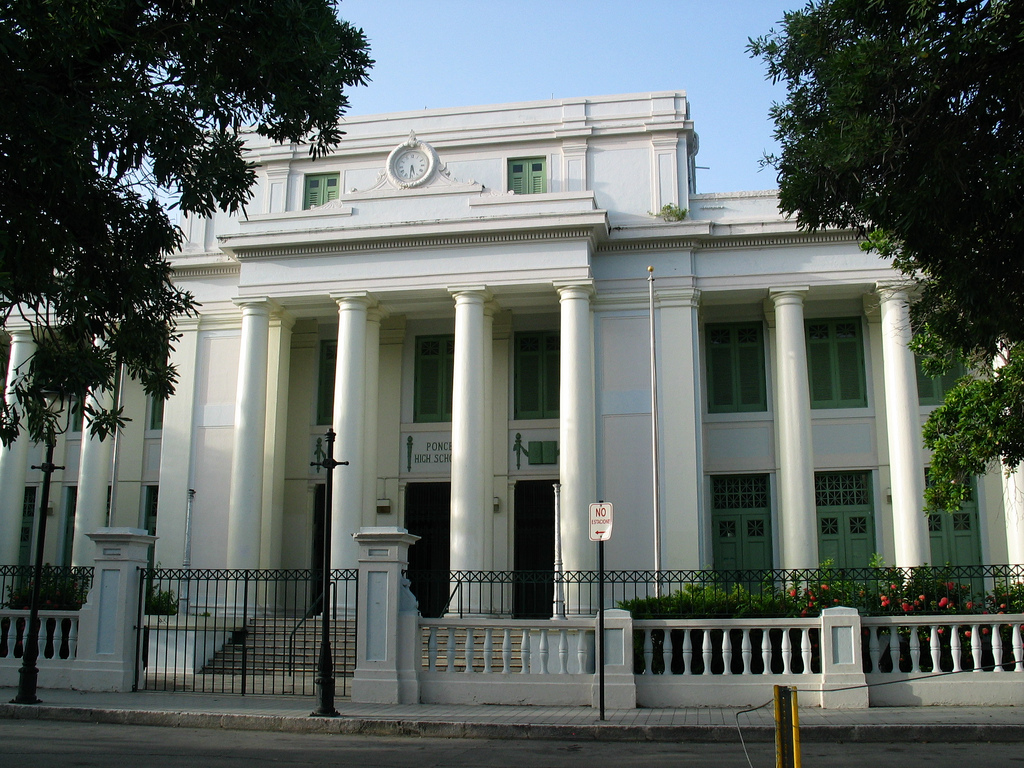
- Partial front facade view of Ponce High School in Ponce, Puerto Rico

Location
- 37 Cristina Street; Ponce, Puerto Rico 00733

Information
- School type: Public secondary
- Founded: 1902
- School district: Ponce District II
- Principal: Dra. Gloria Rodriguez
- Grades: 10–12
- Enrollment: 1650+ (2010)
- Language: Spanish
- Area: Ponce Historic Zone
- Colors: Black, & Red
- Mascot: Lion

The Ponce High School is public educational institution in Ponce, Puerto Rico, offering grades sixth through twelve. The school's main building is a historic structure located on Cristina Street, in the Ponce Historic Zone. From its beginning the school has secured a unique place in Puerto Rico's educational history. Of over 3,000 schools erected in Puerto Rico in the first quarter of the twentieth century, Ponce High was the largest, "at a time enrolling more students than all the other Puerto Rico high schools combined", and for many years enrolling more students than any other high school in Puerto Rico. The cost of the building in 1915 dollars was $150,000 USD ($4.77 million in 2025 dollars). The building was listed on the U.S. National Register of Historic Places on 4 August 1987. The school has the only diamond-level DECA chapter in Puerto Rico. The Ponce High School building is "among the most important public buildings ever built in Puerto Rico." The school is the oldest continuously-operating high school in Puerto Rico.

== History ==
The history of the institution dates back to January 1899. On 25 January 1899 a historic fire took place on the lot currently occupied by the High School. The fire is known as the "Fuego del Polvorín" (the Fire of the Ammunition Depot). At that time the lot was used as a U.S. Army ammunition depot. Today a register marks the location of the fire. In November 1899, the new American government authorized the establishment of a public secondary school in Ponce modeled after the American school system. In 1903 the Roosevelt Industrial School was built on land where the US military had its munitions depot that caused the fire. Five years after El Polvorin, in the 1904-1905 timeframe, a two-story building with 12 classrooms was built to accommodate the Ruiz Gandia Grammar School in the same spacious El Polvorin lot. The first class of Ponce High School students formed in 1902. As new facilities were completed, the students were moved to them. For the 1907-1908 school year another building was built called the McKinley building, and the Ponce High students occupied said facilities as well. Construction of the now-historic Ponce High School building on Cristina Street started in 1915 and the building was inaugurated in 1920.

== Location ==
The school is located in barrio Tercero. It faces Cristina street to the north and is bounded on the south by Comercio street (PR-133), on the west by Salud street, and on the east by Trujillo street. Its location is only two blocks from Plaza Las Delicias. It is also diagonally across from the Ponce Free School of Music, the old location of Liceo de Ponce (Liceo Ponceño), an early 20th-century girls-only school. It is also one block from Teatro La Perla.

== Construction and appearance ==
- Ponce High School
- U.S. National Register of Historic Places
- Location within Puerto Rico
- Location: Cristina Street, Ponce, Puerto Rico
- Coordinates: 18.01155°N 66.61026°W
- Area: 1 acre (0.40 ha)
- Built: by 1915
- Architect: Adrian C. Finlayson
- Architectural style: Neoclassical
- NRHP reference No.: 87001310
- Added to NRHP: 4 August 1987

The main and most historical of the buildings faces north. In the back of this building is a large yard paved with concrete. This backyard contains several other large school buildings. The main building follows the neoclassical architectural style. The front entry consists of a raised portico and a lobby area.

The school library is located on the first floor and the auditorium is on the second floor.

At both Eastern and Western sides of the lobby, and at both levels, L-shaped arcaded hallways lead to the classrooms. Two semi-enclosed patios are thus defined between the library-auditorium wing (much higher and wider) and the identical classroom wings facing East and West. Three sets of stairs are symmetrically laid out in the scheme: one of secondary importance at either side of the lobby; the most public one next to side entrances at the L-shaped circulation wings. A third set of stairs faces the patios and is the only one not to connect to the building's basement where more classrooms are found.

The most continuous side of the E-shaped structure constitutes the front facade; it is articulated to best reflect and express the internal organization in plan. Sophisticated neoclassical details, although integral to the building's public "face", are not used with such insistence anywhere else on the building, except for the lobby, which includes some mouldings, cornices and relatively simple pilaster inlays. Set back from the street, the front facade is enhanced by two small green parterres adjoining the concrete-iron fence and sidewalk. The elevation includes Doric columns and pilasters running two stories high, identical pediments at each end and an escutcheon-like crowning piece with a clock. The latter is dead center over the entrance portico. Concrete flat roofs, an extended parapet and a wide horizontal cornice tie together all the elements, therefore underlining the horizontal continuity of the structure. Fenestration consists mainly of wood louvered windows with glass. Some have been substituted by contemporary metal louvered windows, which are found all over the rest of the building.

A most significant feature of Ponce High School is its two-story high, elongated auditorium, which also contains a generous stage area and a U-shaped wood mezzanine supported from the concrete ceiling. Its original lighting fixtures were removed and replaced by fluorescent ones. Classrooms are well lit and ventilated; there are many openings. Walls are plain, having been painted over and over throughout the years. The original wood floor finish is still retained in the library, the auditorium, and many of the classrooms; some have been substituted or changed to concrete. Hallways and stairs are paved in concrete. Vinyl flooring is used at offices. Glazed concrete tile is found at the lobby, where the original iron grilles, of geometrical design, are still in use.

Two small lean-to wood and zinc structures were added a few years ago. The auditorium was adapted to air conditioning features, with acoustic ceiling and related fixtures having been added. In spite of it all, and probably, because of the school's imposing scale, well balanced proportions and well-kept classical detailing, the integrity has not yet been lost.

== Significance ==
Ponce High School is one of the five best school buildings built in Puerto Rico at the beginning of the 20th century and one of the most impressive. Between 1900 and 1925 over 3,000 schools were erected on the Island; only four included fully equipped auditoriums (not just assembly rooms) in their design: San Juan's Central High, Luis Muñoz Rivera School in Salinas, Arecibo's own Luis Muñoz Rivera School and Ponce High School. In that sense, these are the most representative examples of school building ideas being developed at the time in the United States by architects of renown, such as Haussander and Perkins of Chicago, Snyder of New York, Cooper of Boston and, especially, William B. Ittner of St. Louis.

Given the date of erection (earlier than for most other public schools built on the Island) Ponce High School emerges, as one of the earlier American government-sponsored construction efforts at such a large scale on the Island. Strikingly significant is the fact that with the choice of building vocabulary (strongly reminiscent of Mc Kim, Mead & White's Pennsylvania Station in New York) the use of the neoclassical style for educational structures was introduced in Puerto Rico. Ponce High School is today one of the most dignified and imposing structures in the city, a fact underlined by its architectural style, scale and overall architectural merits.

== Architect ==
So far, the name of the architect for Ponce High School remains a mystery, although many facts point to Adrian C. Finlayson as its designer. Mr. Finlayson was, at the time, architect of the Insular Government's Interior Department, and was responsible for many other structures of similar use, size and style. As such, he is a key figure on Puerto Rico's architectural development. Most historians, however, coincide that Finlayson was in fact its architect.

== Setting ==
Its setting — on a block surrounded by other schools also of architectural merit — adds to the school's important urban role. The site itself is a historic one, where the U.S. Army barracks were once located, before a fire ravaged the premises. The event is widely remembered in Ponce.

== Partial list of principals ==
- Horace O. Wells (c. 1903-?)
- E. N. Gerrish (c. 1911 - ?)
- Charles H. Terry (c. 1915 - ? )
- C. McKroskey (c. 1916-?)
- E. D. Brown (c. 1920 - ?)
- Mariano Villaronga-Toro (c. 1936- ?)
- Charles O. Hamill (c.1944?-1950)
- Esther Renaud de Pagan (? - 1963 - ?)
- Ruth Fotuño de Calzada (c. 1960s)
- Ana Adela de Armas (1970-1985)
- Lydia Quiñones Capo (c. 1987 - 2012)
- Axel Rivera Rouchet (2012 - 2014)
- Jeniffer Machado (2014–Present)

== Alumni ==
Some of the Puerto Rico's most important public figures attended this school: three of Puerto Rico's governors graduated from there. Its auditorium sponsored drama events that were later acknowledged as definitive for the formation of a Puerto Rican theatrical tradition. The auditorium at Ponce High molded those beginnings. In conclusion, the architecture of Ponce High stands out among the Island's built legacy for historic, stylistic, conceptual and symbolic reasons.

=== Notable alumni ===
- Pedro Albizu Campos, Nationalist and independence leader
- Rosa Collazo, Nationalist and independence leader.
- María Teresa Babín Cortés, writer
- Juan H. Cintrón García (class of 1936), mayor of Ponce
- José N. Gándara, physician
- César Luis González Cardona, military aviator
- Manuel González Pató, physical education professor
- Francisco "Paquito" Montaner, baseball player
- Elin Ortiz, actor
- Bolívar Pagán historian, journalist, and politician
- Francisco Porrata Doria, architect
- Ernesto Ramos Antonini, politician
- Teodoro Moscoso, founder of Farmacias Moscoso, diplomat and politician
- Mariana Suarez de Longo, educator
- Luis Torres Nadal, playwright
- Mariano Villaronga Toro, public servant

== See also ==
- National Register of Historic Places listings in southern Puerto Rico
- List of high schools in Puerto Rico
- Campo Atlético Charles H. Terry
