= Quinto, Ponce, Puerto Rico =

Barrio of Puerto Rico

Quinto
- Barrio
- Location of barrio Quinto within the municipality of Ponce shown in red

- Location of Puerto Rico
- Coordinates: 18°00′52″N 66°36′35″W
- Commonwealth: Puerto Rico
- Municipality: Ponce

Area
  - Total: 0.11 sq mi (0.28 km^{2})
  - Land: 0.10 sq mi (0.26 km^{2})
  - Water: 0.01 sq mi (0.026 km^{2})
- Elevation: 66 ft (20 m)

Population (2010)
  - Total: 568
  - Density: 5,680/sq mi (2,190/km^{2})
- Source: 2010 Census
- Time zone: UTC−4 (AST)

Quinto (Barrio Quinto) is one of the 31 barrios of the municipality of Ponce, Puerto Rico. Together with Primero, Segundo, Tercero, Cuarto, and Sexto, Quinto is one of the municipality's six original urban barrios. It was organized in 1878.

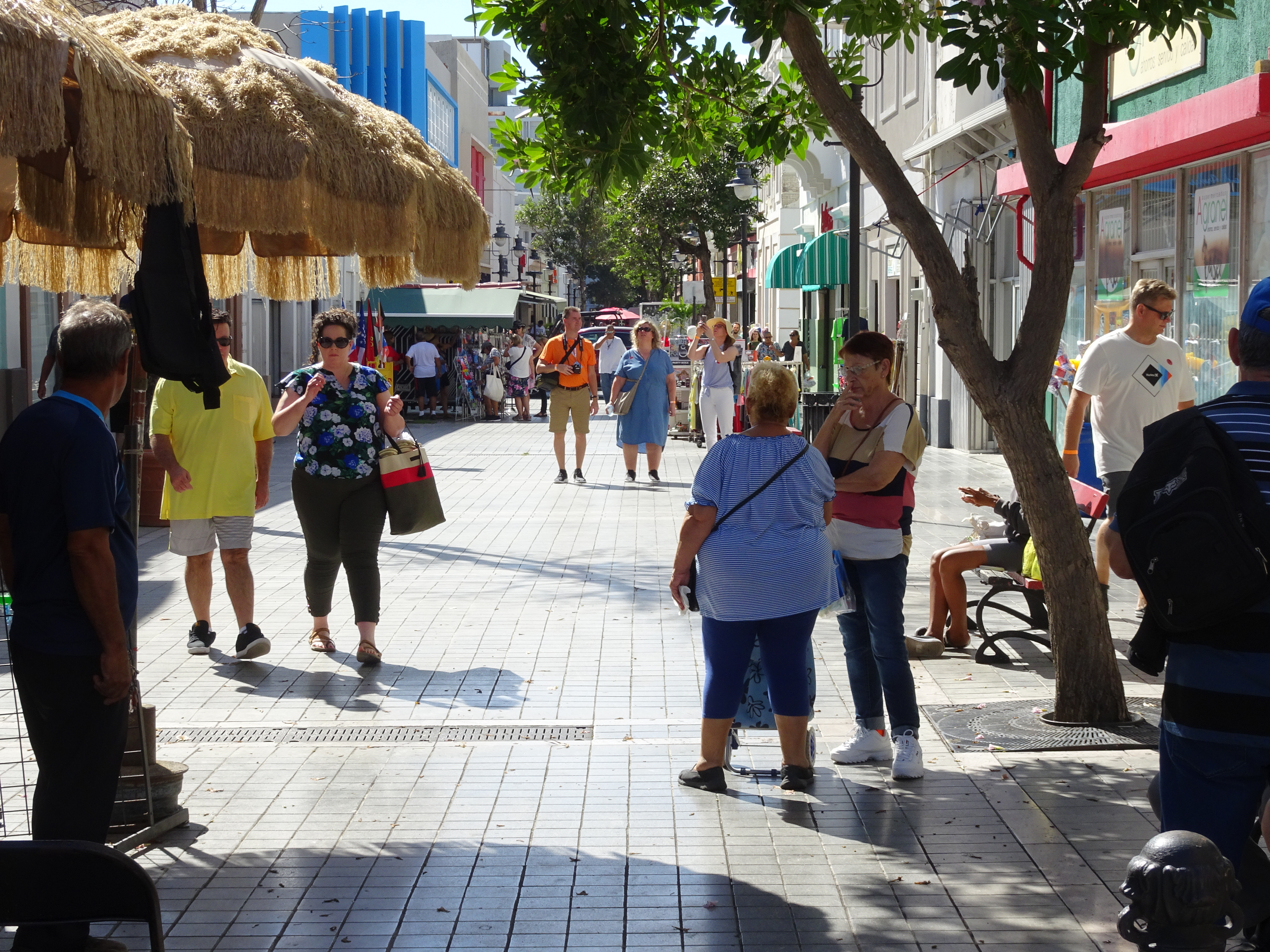
Paseo Atocha, the western boundary of Barrio Quinto. Stores on the right are part of Barrio Segundo

== Location ==
Quinto is an urban barrio located in the southern section of the municipality, within the Ponce city limits, and northeast of the traditional center of the city, Plaza Las Delicias.

== Boundaries ==
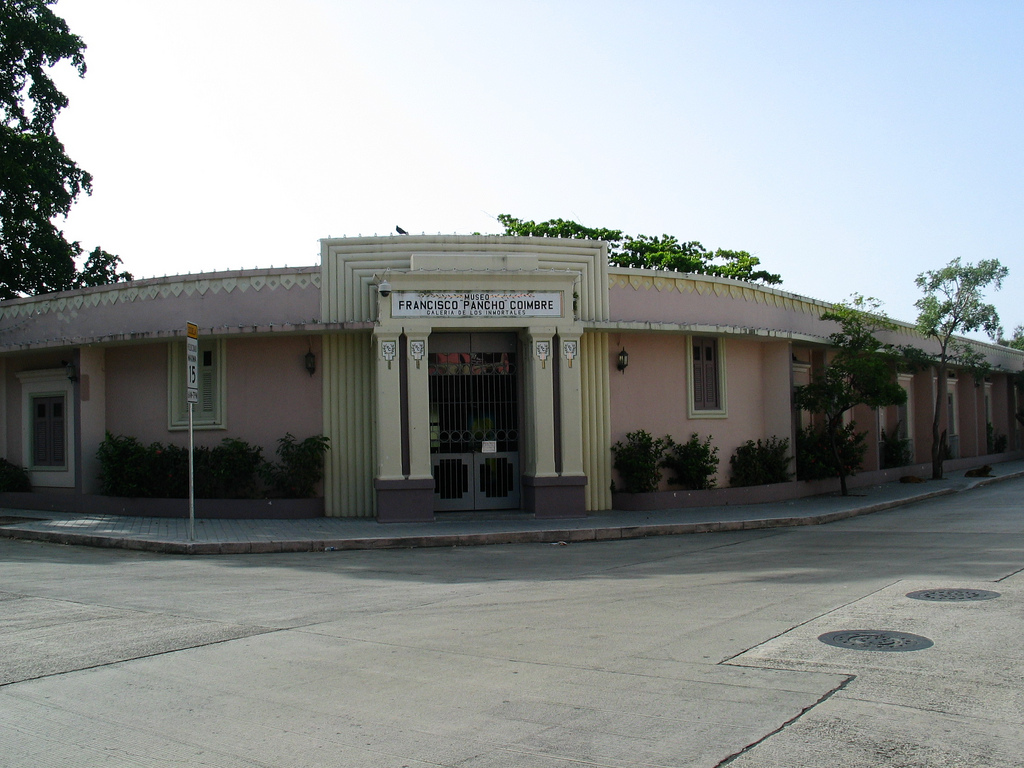
Francisco Pancho Coimbre Museum at Lolita Tizol and Castillo Streets in Barrio Quinto

Barrio Quinto is bounded on the North by Guadalupe Street, on the South by Isabel Street, on the West by Atocha Street, and on the East by Rio Portugues.

In terms of barrio-to-barrio boundaries, Quinto is bounded in the North by Sexto, in the South by Tercero, in the West by Segundo, and in the East by Machuelo Abajo.

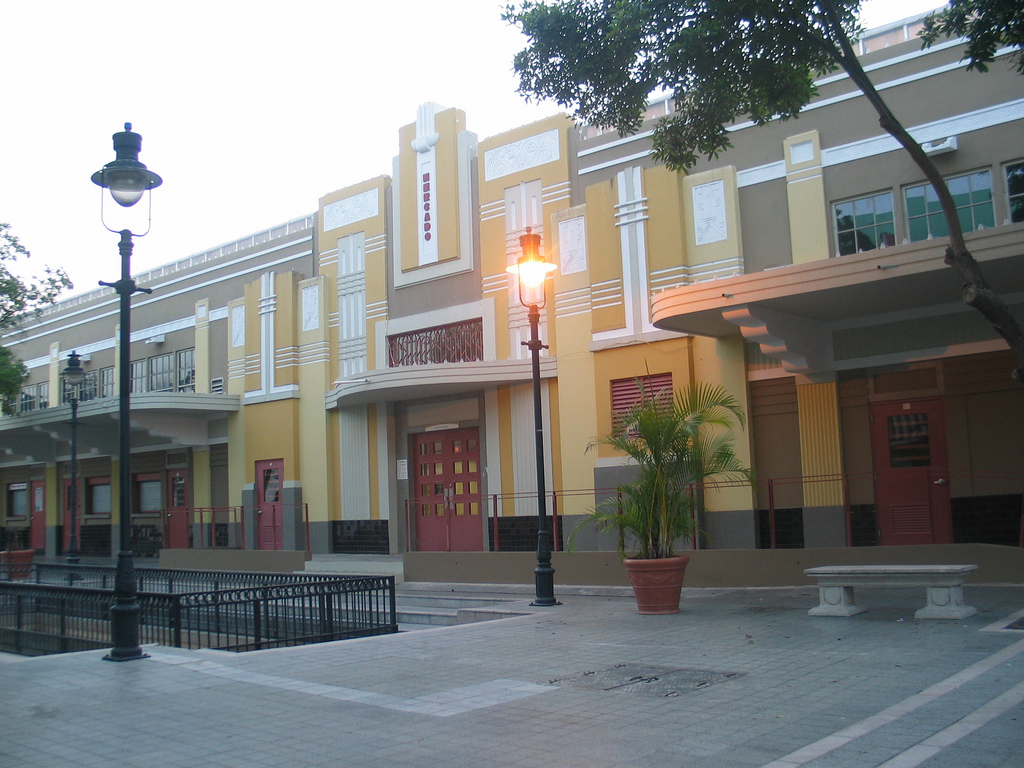
Barrio Quinto is part of Ponce's historic district, and Plaza del Mercado Isabel II is one of many historic structures in Barrio Quinto

== Features and demographics ==
Quinto has 0.1 square miles (260,000 m^{2}) of land area and no water area. In 2000, the population of Qinto was 724. The population density in Quinto was 6,811 persons per square mile.

In 2010, the population of Quinto was 568 persons, and it had a density of 5,680 persons per square mile.

Historical population
Census	Pop.	Note	%±
1900	4,511		—
1910	4,221		−6.4%
1920	4,808		13.9%
1930	2,512		−47.8%
1940	3,041		21.1%
1950	2,551		−16.1%
1960	1,938		−24.0%
1970	1,533		−20.9%
1980	1,247		−18.7%
1990	1,026		−17.7%
2000	724		−29.4%
2010	568		−21.5%
U.S. Decennial Census; 1899 (shown as 1900) 1910-1930; 1930-1950 1960 1980-2000 2010

== Notable landmarks ==
Quinto is home to the Museo Francisco Pancho Coimbre. Also, the Isabel II Marketplace (Plaza del Mercado de Ponce) is located here. NRHP-listed landmarks in Barrio Quinto include the Font-Ubides House, the Mercado de las Carnes (Plaza Juan Ponce de León), and the old Spanish Military Headquarters/city jail.

== Gallery ==
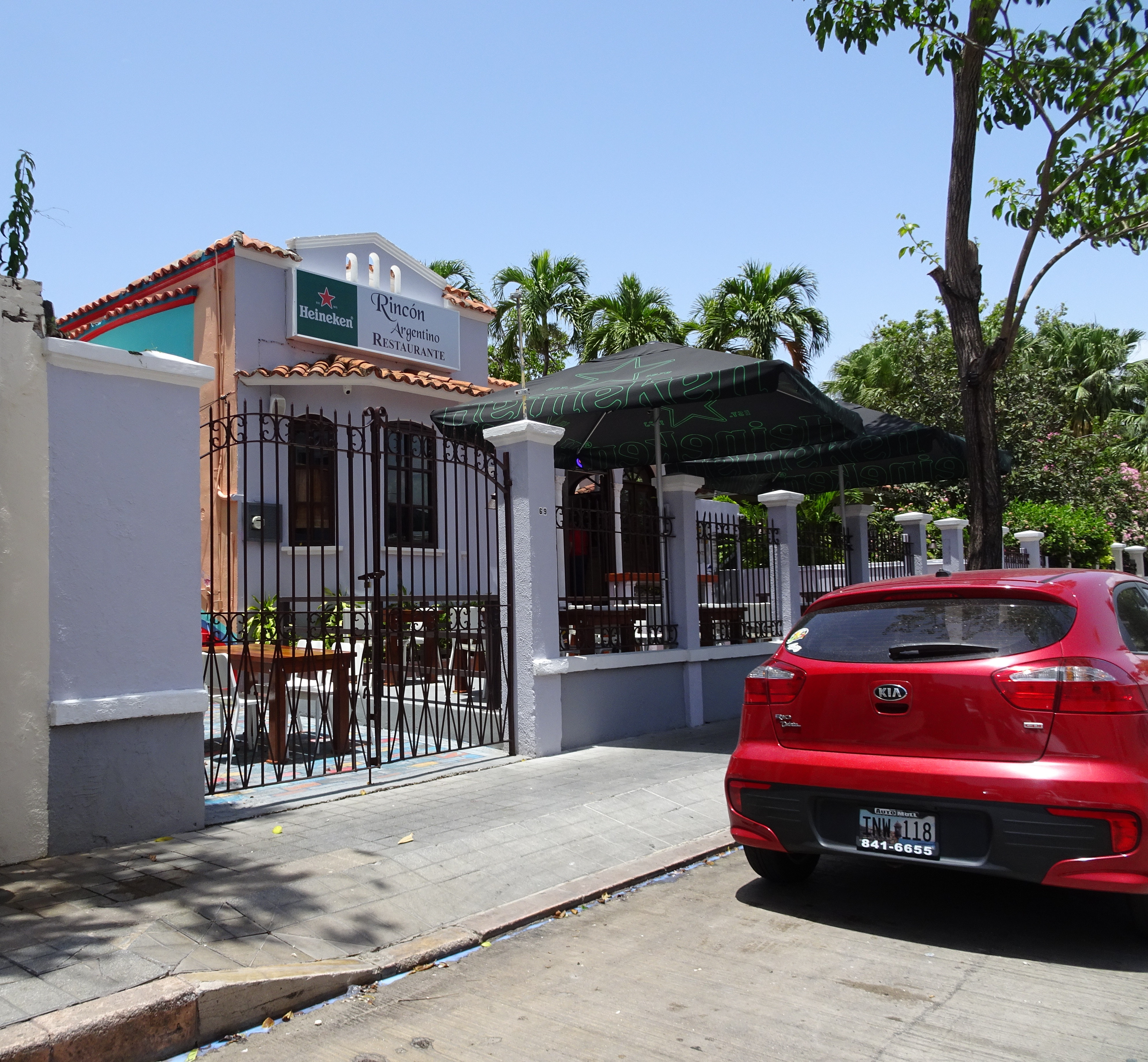
Argentinian restaurant on Calle Salud

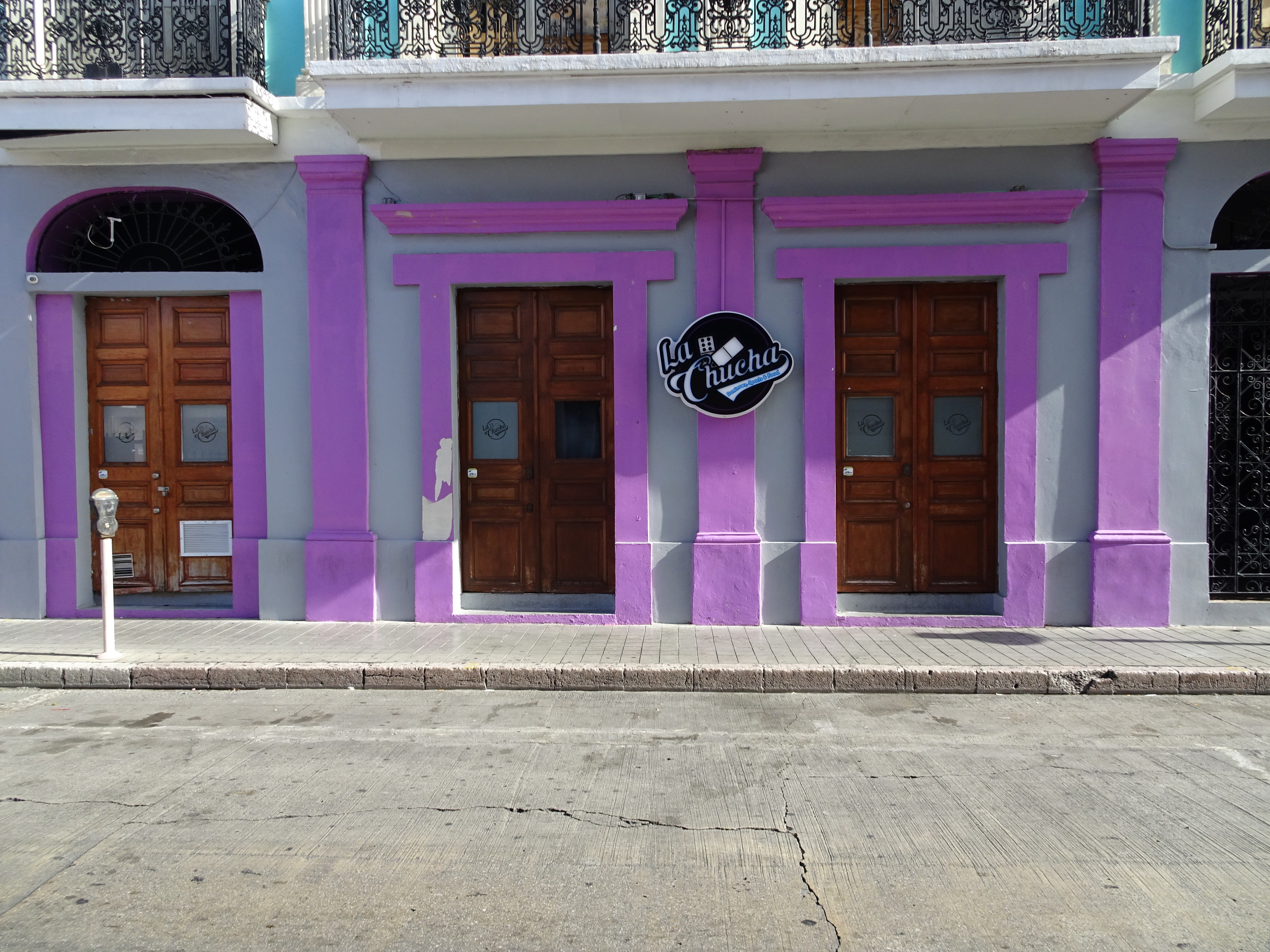
Sports bar on Calle Isabel

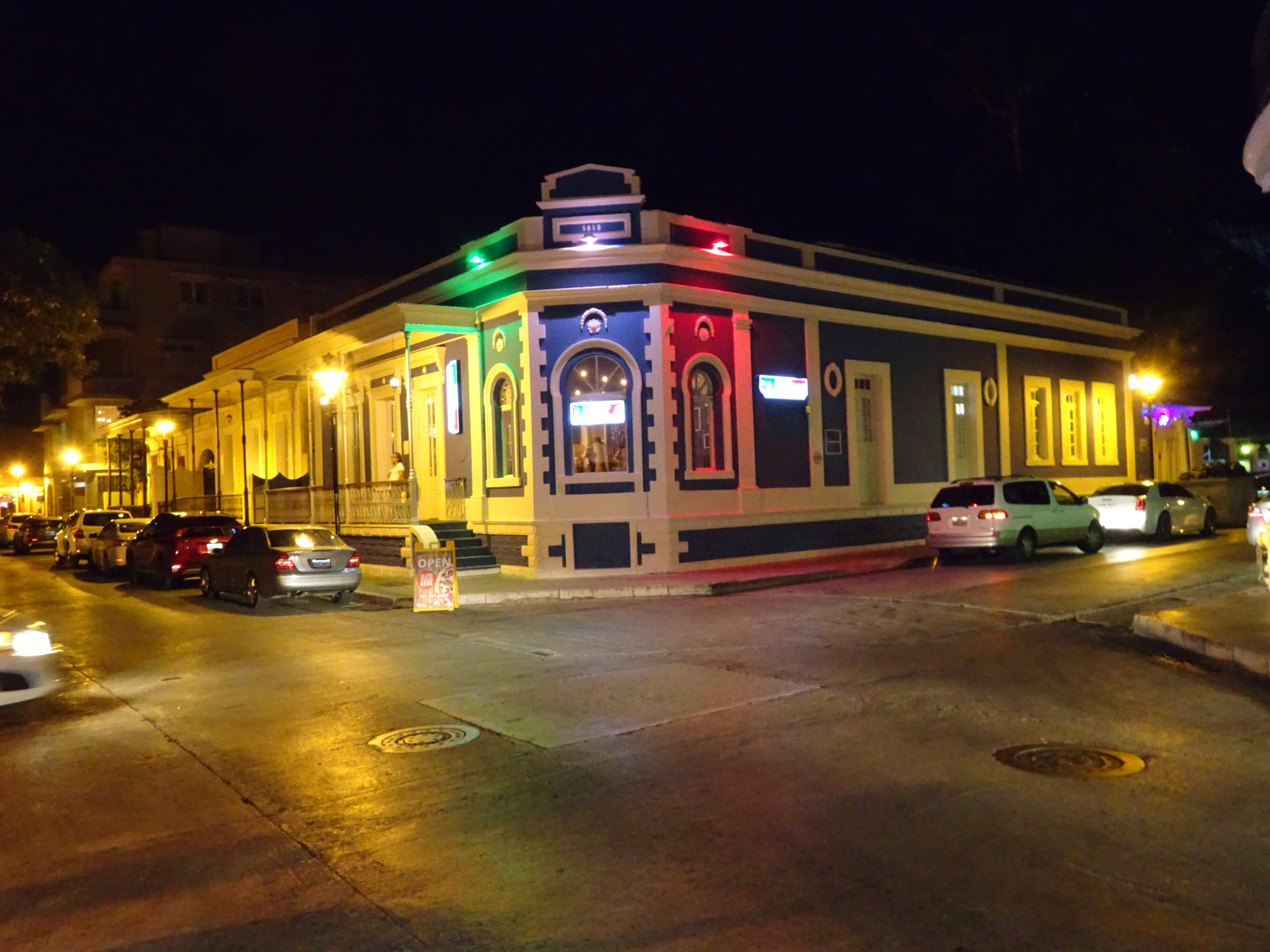
Italian restaurant on Calles Isabel and Salud

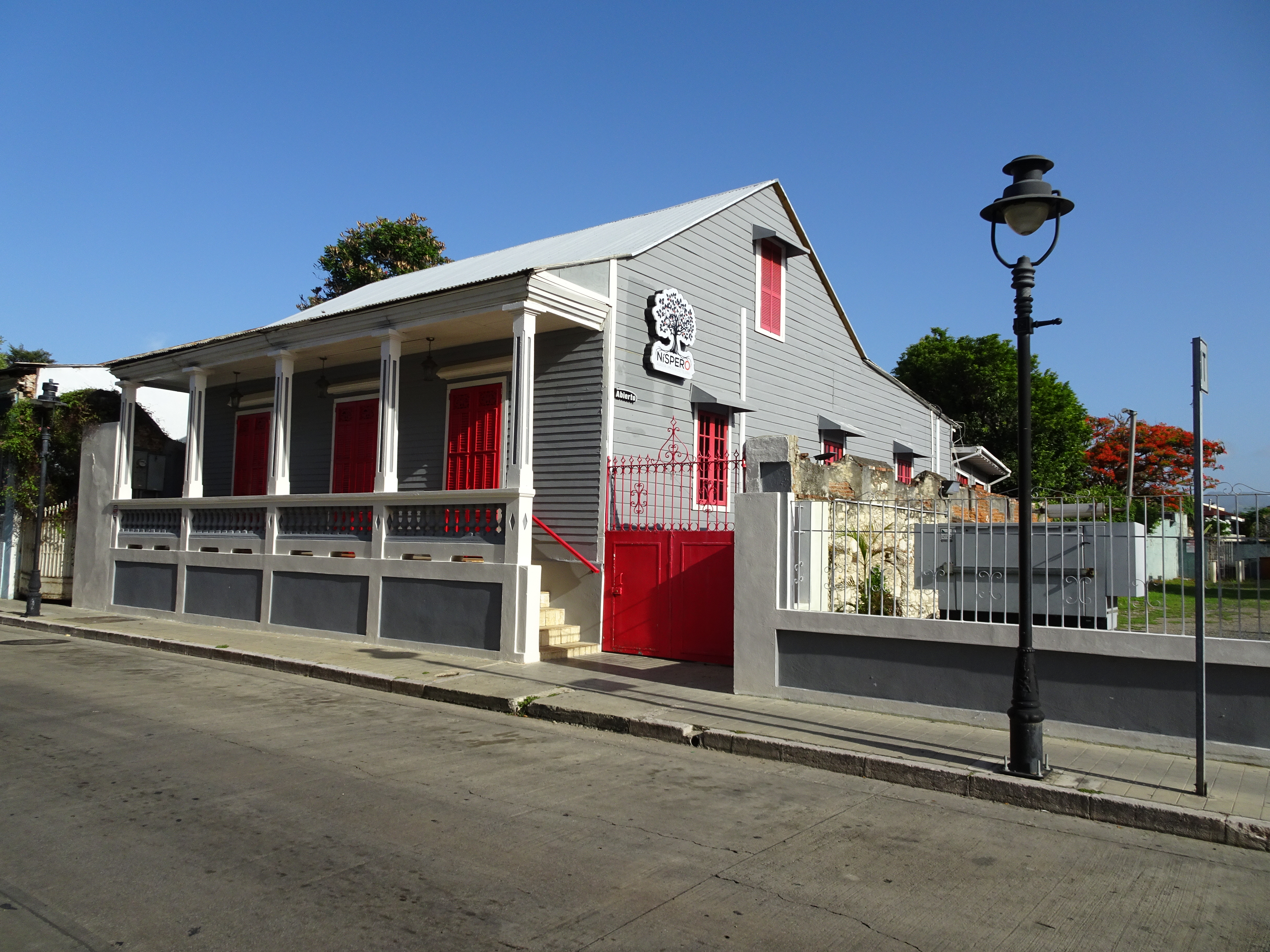
Puerto Rican 'Criollo' food restaurant on Calle Isabel

== See also ==
- List of communities in Puerto Rico
