= Domingo Marrero Navarro =

Puerto Rican writer (1909–1960)

- Puerto Rican educator, writer, and speaker
- Born: 11 January 1909; Belgica sector of Barrio Cuarto, Ponce, Puerto Rico
- Died: 20 August 1960 (aged 51); Río Piedras, Puerto Rico
- Occupations: Educator, writer, and speaker
- Spouse: Carmen Luisa Castillo

Domingo Marrero Navarro (1909–1960) was a Puerto Rican educator, writer, and speaker.

== Early years ==
Reverend Professor Domingo Marrero Navarro was born in the Belgica community of Barrio Cuarto, Ponce, Puerto Rico, on 11 January 1909. He was the son of Don Domingo Marrero and Doña Antonia Navarro.

== Training ==
In 1929 Marrero Navarro received a Diploma in Theology from the Evangelical Seminary of Puerto Rico. His first pastorship was in 1930 at the Methodist Church of Garrochales, Arecibo, Puerto Rico. In 1932, he completed a B.A. in Education from the University of Puerto Rico. He was awarded the "Medalla Quijote" at that institution.

In 1945, he started graduate studies in philosophy at Columbia University. Likewise in 1946, he starts graduate studies in Hebrew literature, and theology and philosophy of religion at Drew University, and starts studies with professor Paul Tillich in the Union Theological Seminary. In 1949 he received a Law Degree (LL.D.) from the University of Puerto Rico School of Law.

== Work life ==
In 1935, he traveled to the Dominican Republic as a missionary of the Methodist Church, where he stayed until 1938. In 1938, he returned to Puerto Rico, where he worked for the next five years as chaplain of the Evangelical University Students Fraternity of the University of Puerto Rico, Río Piedras. In that same year, he received a B.A. degree in Theology at the Evangelical Seminary of Puerto Rico. From 1945 to 1954, Marrero was Professor of Biblical Literature, Philosophy, and Theology at the Evangelical Seminary. Between 1945 and 1950, he held various positions at the University of Puerto Rico. He was dean of the School of General Studies.

== Family life ==
On March 15, 1935 he married Carmen Luisa Castillo and they had five children: Domingo, Carmín, Quisqueya, Nora and Ernesto.

== Last years ==
Marrero Navarro died on August 20, 1960, in Rio Piedras, Puerto Rico, at 51 years of age.

== Legacy ==
The main building at the School of General Studies of the University of Puerto Rico at Rio Piedras is named in his honor.

== Writings ==
Among his most outstanding works are:

- 1949 – Los Fundamentos de la Libertad.
- 1950 – Meditaciones de la Pasión.
- 1951 – El Centauro, Persona y Pensamiento de Ortega y Gasset. (This book received an award from the Institute of Puerto Rican Culture).

== See also ==
- List of Puerto Rican writers
- List of Puerto Ricans
- Puerto Rican literature
