= Sexto, Ponce, Puerto Rico =

Barrio of Puerto Rico

Sexto Cantera
- Barrio
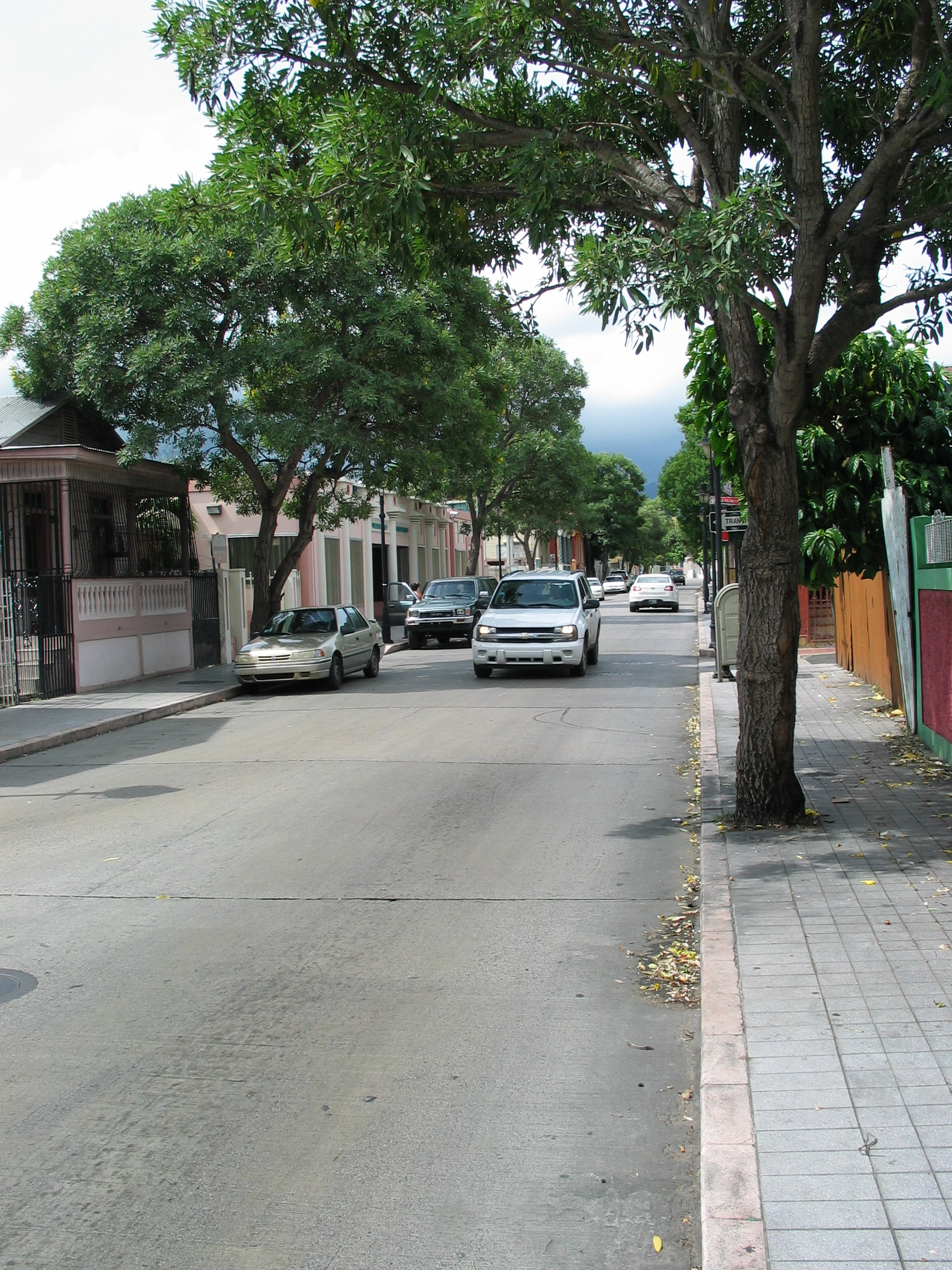
- Daily life captured at Calle Mayor Cantera street in Barrio Sexto, in the Ponce Historic Zone, Ponce, Puerto Rico

- Location of barrio Sexto within the municipality of Ponce shown in red

- Location of Puerto Rico
- Coordinates: 18°01′17″N 66°36′42″W
- Commonwealth: Puerto Rico
- Municipality: Ponce

Area
  - Total: 0.27 sq mi (0.70 km^{2})
  - Land: 0.27 sq mi (0.70 km^{2})
  - Water: 0 sq mi (0 km^{2})
- Elevation: 75 ft (23 m)

Population (2010)
  - Total: 3,529
  - Density: 13,573.1/sq mi (5,240.6/km^{2})
- Source: 2010 Census
- Time zone: UTC−4 (AST)

Sexto (Barrio Sexto) is one of the 31 barrios of the municipality of Ponce, Puerto Rico. Along with Primero, Segundo, Tercero, Cuarto, and Quinto, Sexto is one of the municipality's six core urban barrios. Barrio Sexto used to be called Barrio Cantera. It was organized in 1878.

== Location ==
Sexto is an urban barrio located in the southern section of the municipality, within the Ponce city limits, and north of the traditional center of the city, Plaza Las Delicias. The former name of barrio Sexto (Sixth) was barrio Cantera (Quarry) because there was a stone quarry in that region. At 2.5 kilometres (1.6 mi) northeast of Plaza Las Delicias were located the "Baños Termales de Quintana" (Quintana Thermal Baths) (Note: The Quintana Baths were destroyed in the last decades of the 20th century to channelize Río Portugués as well as to build the PR-10 road from Ponce to Adjuntas. (See The Quintana Medical Baths, Near Ponce, Porto Rico. Las fotos de Puerto Rico en 'Our Islands and Their People'. Jose A. Mari Mut. 2013. Vol II, page 392. (Digital version page 132.)) as well as a quarry of white stone in this area.

== Boundaries ==
Barrio Sexto is bounded on the North by Cayey Street, on the South by Guadalupe Street, on the West by Atocha Street, and on the East by Rio Portugues.

In terms of barrio-to-barrio boundaries, Sexto is bounded in the North by Portugués Urbano and Machuelo Abajo, in the South by Quinto, in the West by Segundo and Portugués Urbano, and in the East by Machuelo Abajo.

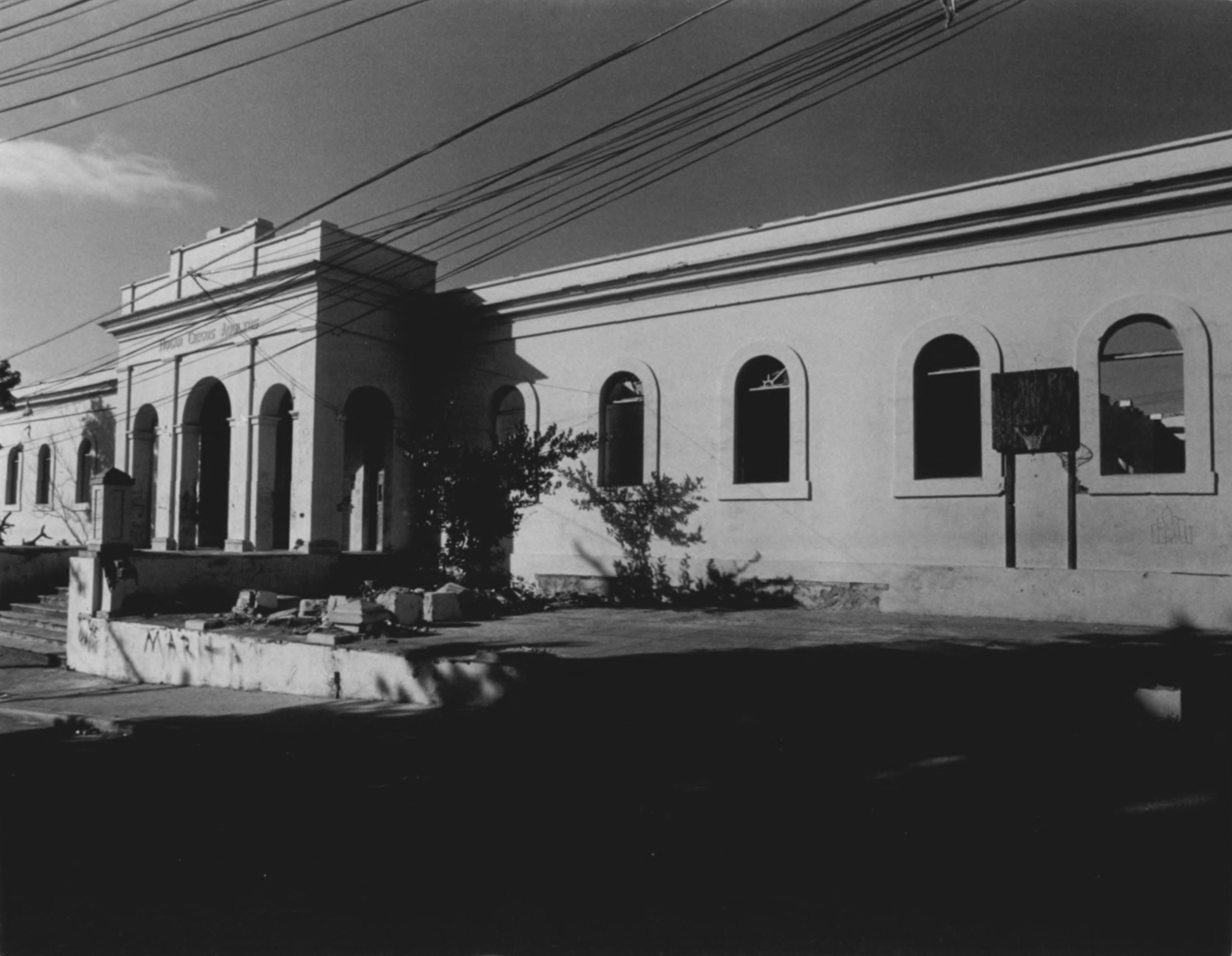
The former Spanish Military Hospital in Barrio Sexto.

== Features and demographics ==
Sexto has 0.1 square miles (260,000 m^{2}) of land area and no water area. In 2000, the population of Sexto was 4,745. The population density in Sexto was 18,222 persons per square mile.

In 2010, the population of Sexto was 3,529 persons, and it had a density of 13,573.1 persons per square mile.

The communities of La Cantera, Hoyo de Pepe, El Yeso, and Pueblito Nuevo are found here.

== Notable landmarks ==
Barrio Sexto is home to the NRHP-listed old Spanish Military Hospital.

== Notable people from Sexto ==
- Pete "El Conde" Rodríguez, singer, composer, orchestra director

== In popular culture ==
- The salsa song by La Sonora Ponceña, (Inca Records, 1969) Hay Fuego en el 23 starts by saying "Fuego! Se quemó la Cantera" (Fire! Cantera burned down!)
- Another salsa song, by Pete "El Conde" Rodríguez (Fania Records, 1972) titled Quítate tú, the 3rd stance says "De donde viene este prieto?, se pregunta mucha gente; De la Cantera de Ponce vengo yo, con este ritmo caliente" (Where does that Negro come from?, many people ask; I come from the Ponce's Cantera, with this hot rhythm.")
- The salsa song by Ismael Rivera with Bobby Capo, titled Mi Tia Maria (Tico Records, 1975 {Album: "Feliz Navidad"}), has a portion that reads "Que vengan los de Cantera, de Loíza y Villa Palmeras..." (Let those from Cantera come, from Loíza and from Villa Palmeras...)

== See also ==
- List of communities in Puerto Rico
