= Museo Francisco "Pancho" Coimbre =

Museum in Ponce, Puerto Rico

Museo Francisco "Pancho" Coímbre
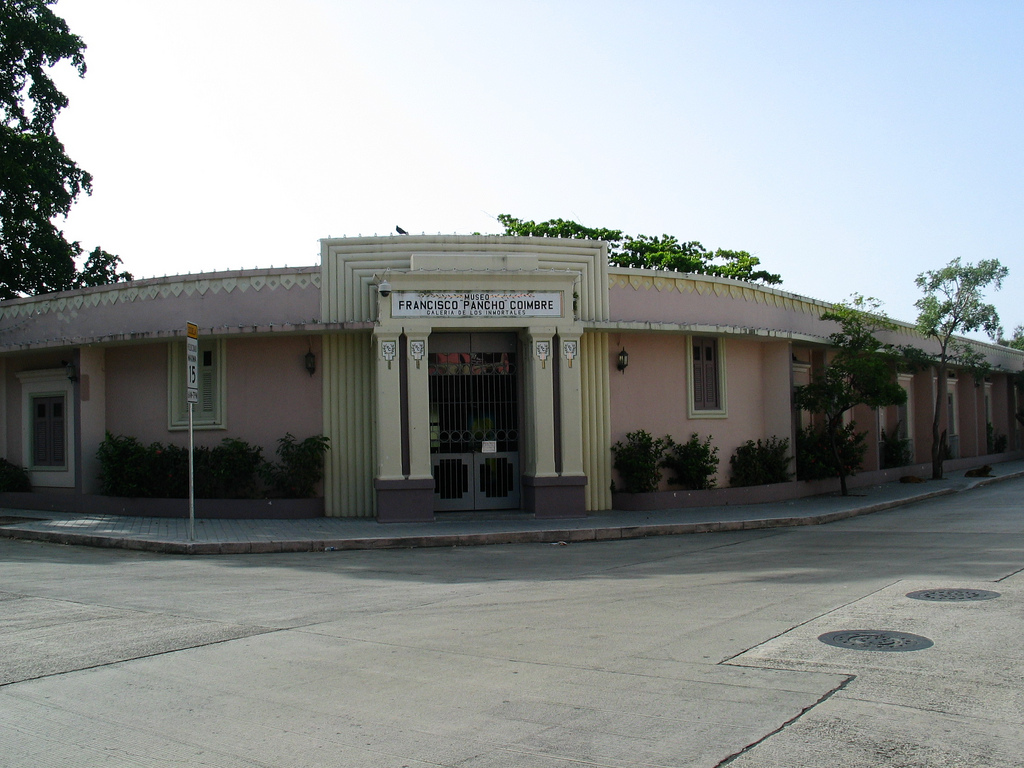
- Museo Francisco "Pancho" Coímbre looking southeast

- Location in Puerto Rico
- Established: 1992
- Location: Calle Lolita Tizol & Calle Castillo, Ponce, Puerto Rico; 787-843-6553
- Coordinates: 18°0′52.7754″N 66°36′32.4354″W
- Type: Sports Museum
- Director: Hector L. Ortiz
- Owner: Autonomous Municipality of Ponce
- Website: www.museopanchocoimbre.org/

Museo Francisco "Pancho" Coímbre (English: Francisco "Pancho" Coímbre Museum) is a sports museum in Ponce, Puerto Rico. Inaugurated on 21 January 1992, it is Puerto Rico's first sports museum.

== History ==
The Francisco Pancho Coimbre Sports Museum was inaugurated on 21 January 1992. It was named after Ponce's own baseball great, Pancho Coímbre, who is considered "the most feared and productive Puerto Rican baseball batter of all times." The museum also acts as home to Ponce's Sports Hall of Fame. The museum is located on Lolita Tizol street, next to various other attractions, including the old Spanish military barracks.

On 12 January 2010, a new track and field gallery was inaugurated in memory of Juan "Papo" Franceschi, one of many heroes from the San Antón barrio.

== Features ==
The museum is a one-room museum that houses a collection of photographs, documents and memorabilia regarding the early days of baseball in Puerto Rico, "back when professional players won only $5 per game and played the game during daylight hours only." Some of the names in the museum are not well known, such as Francisco “Pancho” Coimbre, Rafael “Rafaelito” Ortíz, or Emilio "Millito" Navarro, because they never played in the Major Leagues. However, they did serve as the source of inspiration for easily recognized figures such as Roberto Clemente.

Pancho Coimbre Museum also has displays about early women sport stars and racially divided baseball leagues. Among the interesting pieces of memorabilia is a uniform from Ponce's short-lived women's baseball team and a baseball bat that was the only object to survive the house fire that killed Coimbre.

== Significance ==
The museum highlights Coimbre's athletic career, focusing on his speed, strength, and the pride Puerto Rico has for his achievements. He served as a significant influence for many aspiring baseball players in the country.

"Coimbre began his career as an eager seventeen year old in 1926 and had landed a place in the New York Cubans. By the time he retired from professional baseball in 1951, he was the darling of every local in Ponce and they opened their hearts and gave support to the magnificent sportsman. He remained in the sports industry, and in Ponce, until his tragic death in 1989 when his home burnt to the ground."
