= Antiguo Cuartel Militar Español de Ponce =

Historic building in Ponce, Puerto Rico

- U.S. National Register of Historic Places
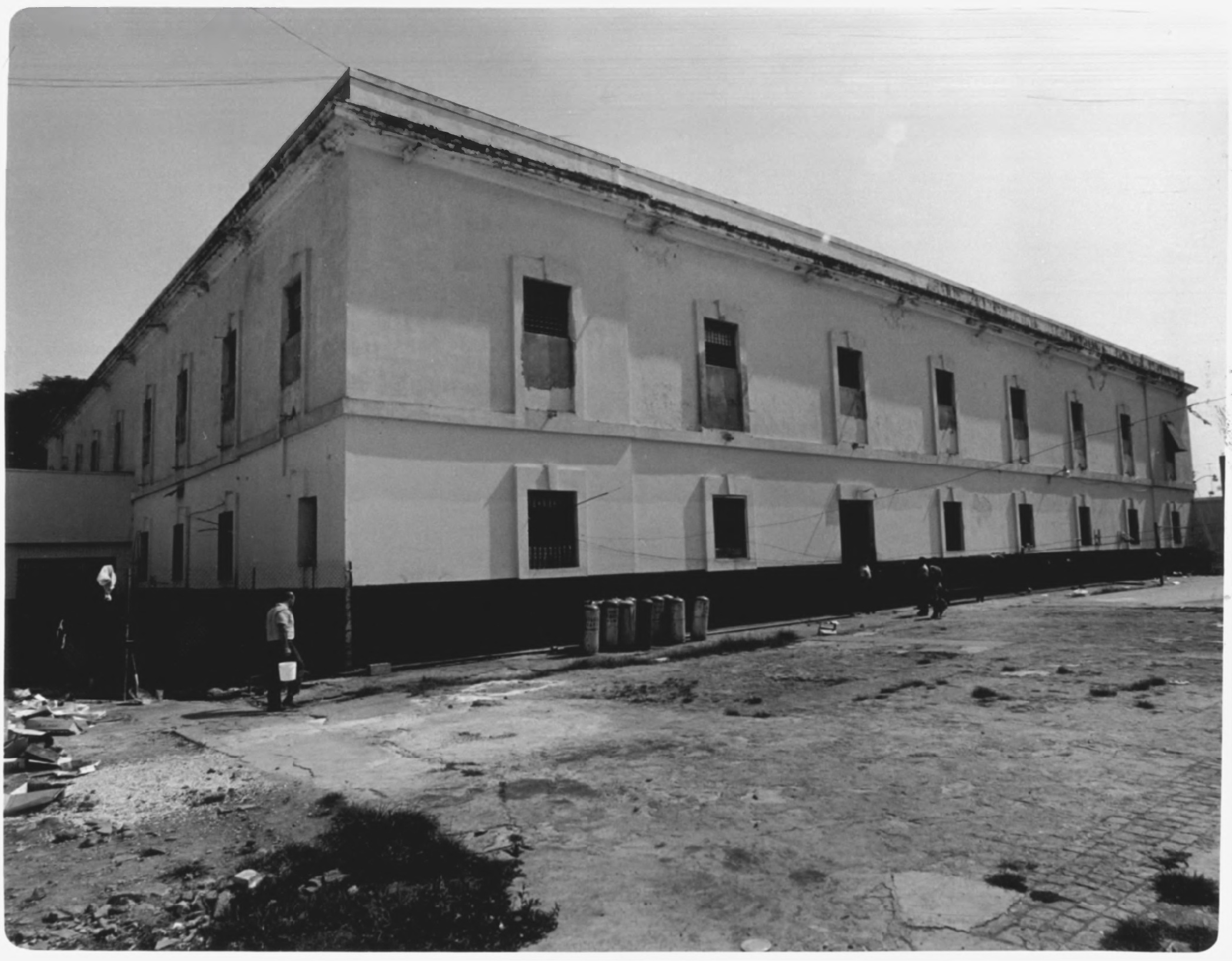

- Location within Puerto Rico
- Location: Calle Castillo Final, Ponce, Puerto Rico
- Coordinates: 18°00′55″N 66°36′30″W
- Area: less than one acre
- Built: 1894
- Architect: Spanish Royal Corps of Engineers
- Architectural style: Neoclassical and 19th Century Civil Architecture
- MPS: 19th Century Civil Architecture in Ponce TR
- NRHP reference No.: 87000772

The Antiguo Cuartel Militar Español de Ponce or El Castillo ('Old Spanish Military Headquarters in Ponce' or 'The Castle') is the only structure directly related to the events of the land defense of Puerto Rico during the 1898 American invasion of the Island. The historic building dates from 1894 (Note: Eduardo Neumann Gandia (Verdadera y Autentica Historia de la Ciudad de Ponce, 1913, Reprinted 1987, pp. 104-105) states it was built in 1849. Whichever of the two dates is the correct date, it appears that one or the other of these two sources (Eduardo Neumann Gandia's and Mariano G. Corona Castro's) is incorrect by the transposition of the last two digits of the states years (1849 v. 1894)) and is located on Calle Castillo in Ponce, Puerto Rico, in the city's historic district. The structure was listed on the U.S. National Register of Historic Places on 14 May 1987.

== History ==
"El Castillo", as this building is commonly known, was built in 1894 by the Spanish Royal Corps of Engineers as general headquarters for the Spanish military garrison stationed in Ponce. Since 1898, when Puerto Rico became a possession of the United States, this structure has served various purposes, first as courthouse and later as district jailhouse. It was being used as a district jail house in 1987. In the late 1980s, it ceased to be used as a district jail, was reconditioned, and in 1992 it was inaugurated as the headquarters of the Ponce School of Fine Arts, which is its role.

The building was designed by the Spanish Royal Corps of Engineers. The architecture consists of 19th Century Civil Architecture. It is one of the largest Neoclassic Isabelino civil architecture structures built in Ponce during the 19th century. Its sober exterior walls help express its intended original use. The building played a significant role in law enforcement during the last years of the Spanish colonial rule for southern Puerto Rico and has played a significant role for both law enforcement and judicial purposes since then.

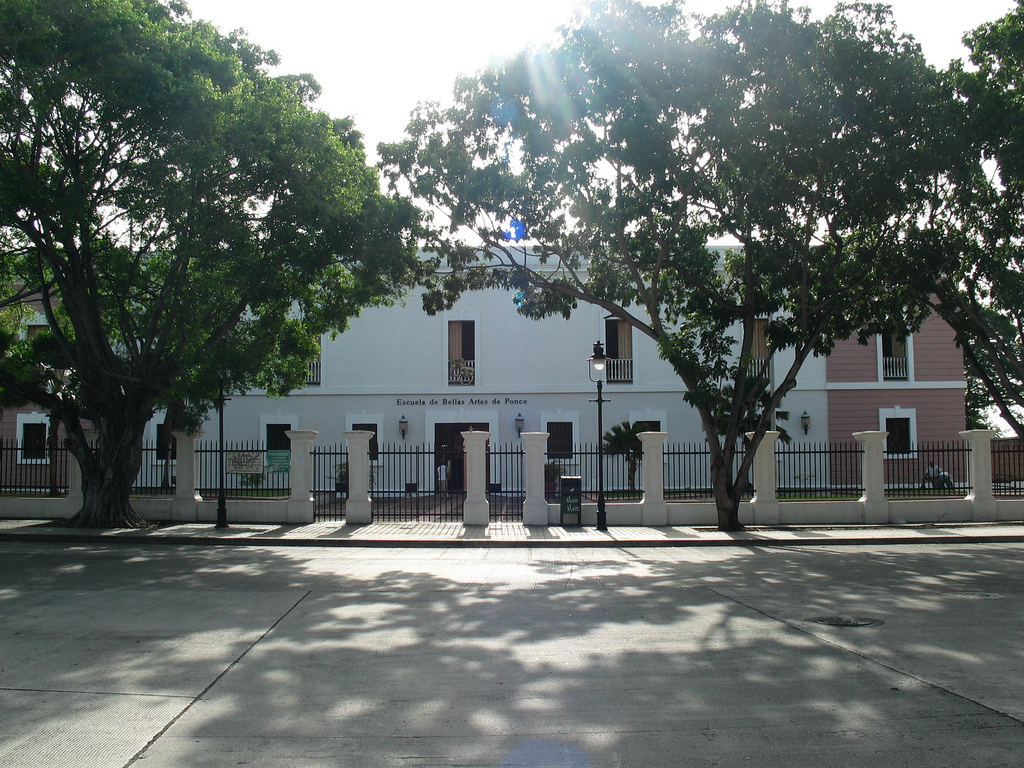
Front view of Escuela de Bellas Artes de Ponce (Ponce School of Fine Arts) in Barrio Quinto in Ponce, Puerto Rico, the new tenant at "El Castillo".

== Significance ==
The Spanish garrison stationed in Ponce at the time of the arrival of the American troops in 1898 played a significant role in the defense of the island. While the Spanish commander in charge of the Ponce garrison had determined it was not possible to defend the city of Ponce from the American advance at the time, the Ponce troops, together with the aid of other smaller garrisons, held the Asomante area preventing the U.S. Army from invading Aibonito in their advance to the conquest of fortified areas of San Juan. The Ponce garrison also helped the Guayama garrison in its attempt to detain American troops from taking that city. "This is the only structure directly related to these [land] events that has been identified to date".

== Description ==
The building consists of a two level square structure with an interior courtyard. It is built in brick and stone masonry; timber beams and brick layers were used for the roof and floors. The interior courtyard is surrounded by open-arched galleries in both levels. During the time when the building was being used as a district jail in 1987, the galleries provided the foundation of the jail barracks.

A repetition of windows over the facade's plane without any ornament gives the building an austere appearance, typical of military architecture developed during the Spanish period in Puerto Rico. The building still preserves its original lead gutters in the form of cannons. The building has been altered little since its original construction. The most significant alteration has been the replacement of the original wooden louvers windows with metal louvered windows. Also, iron bars have been added to its interior openings. The building has also been upgraded in two rather minimal ways: the interior courtyard was repaved and modern sanitary facilities were installed.

== See also ==
- Fuerte de San José
