= Rodulfo del Valle =

Puerto Rican politician

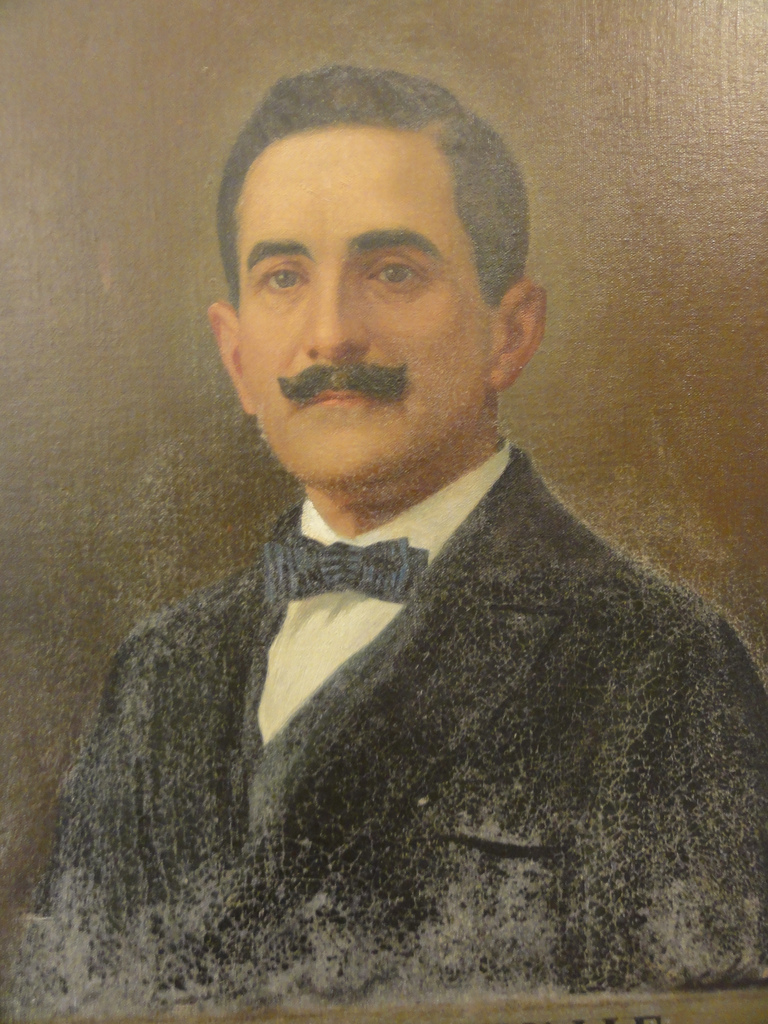
- Mayor Rodulfo del Valle

115th Mayor of Ponce, Puerto Rico
- In office 1918–1920
- Preceded by: Luis Yordán Dávila
- Succeeded by: Francisco Parra Capó

Personal details
- Born: 1871 Ponce, Puerto Rico
- Died: 22 July 1948 Ponce, Puerto Rico
- Spouse: María Amelia Serra Gaztambide
- Children: Eduardo
- Profession: Attorney

Rodulfo del Valle, a.k.a., Don Fito, (1871–1948) was Mayor of Ponce, Puerto Rico, from 1918 to 1920.

== Early years ==
Del Valle's parents were Rodulfo del Valle and Felipa del Valle. He married Amelia Serra.

== Political career ==
Del Valle "was a man that loved his hometown and was loved by his peers." He was a member of the Liberal Reformist Party (later the Puerto Rican Autonomist Party) in 1887 representing the town of Isabela. Del Valle worked for the autonomy of Puerto Rico from both Spain and, later, from the United States. In the Ponce Municipal Government, del Valle served as Commissioner of Public Service and Municipal Treasurer. As mayor of Ponce, he was a member of the Union of Puerto Rico Party.

== Family life ==
Del Valle married María Amelia Serra Gaztambide and had a son named Eduardo.

== Death and legacy ==
Del Valle died in Ponce on 22 July 1948. He was buried at Cementerio Católico San Vicente de Paul. A public school in Ponce was named after him. In Ponce there is a street in Urbanizacion Las Delicias of Barrio Magueyes named after him.

== See also ==
- Ponce, Puerto Rico
- List of Puerto Ricans
- List of mayors of Ponce, Puerto Rico

Political offices
Preceded by Luis Yordán Dávila	Mayor of Ponce, Puerto Rico; 1918–1920	Succeeded by Francisco Parra Capó
