= Francisco Parra Duperón =

Puerto Rican lawyer

- Born: 1827; Mayagüez, Puerto Rico
- Died: 1899 (aged 71–72); Ponce, Puerto Rico
- Occupation: lawyer banker
- Known for: Co-founder of Banco Crédito y Ahorro Ponceño
- Spouse: Eufemia Capó Ortiz de la Renta Bermudas
- Children: Pedro Juan Parra Capó; Francisco Parra Capó

Francisco Parra Duperón (1827–1899) born in Mayagüez, Puerto Rico, was a lawyer and banker. He became a lawyer at a young age and moved from Mayagüez to Ponce, Puerto Rico, where he established his law practice. He was also one of the founders of the Banco Crédito y Ahorro Ponceño, and he was the bank's first president from 1895 until 1896. Teatro La Perla, was built in May 1864 under his initiative and that of Pedro Garriga.

== Legacy ==
The city of Ponce honored him by naming part of Puerto Rico Highway 133 "Francisco Parra Duperon Street" in his honor. There is also a school in Barrio Canas named in his honor.

== Personal life ==
Parra Duperon married Eufemia Capó Ortiz de la Renta Bermudas and they had two children, Pedro Juan Parra Capó and Francisco Parra Capó. Pedro Juan became captain of the Seventh Brigade of the Ponce Municipal Fire Corps in 1899, while Francisco became mayor of the city of Ponce.

== Death ==
Died on September 25, 1899, in Ponce, Puerto Rico. He was buried at Panteón Nacional Román Baldorioty de Castro in Ponce.

== See also ==
- Ponce, Puerto Rico
- List of Puerto Ricans
