= 1906 Puerto Rican general election =

1906 Puerto Rico elections
- November 6, 1906

General elections were held in Puerto Rico in 1906. Tulio Larrínaga was re-elected as Resident Commissioner.

== Results ==
=== Resident Commissioner ===
Candidate	Party	Votes	%
Tulio Larrínaga	Union of Puerto Rico	98,406	64.60
Francisco Parra Capó	Republican Party	53,932	35.40
Total		152,338	100.00
Source: Nolla
