= Casimiro Berenguer =

Puerto Rican independence advocate

Casimiro Berenguer Padilla
- Born: March 4, 1909; Bajura, Cabo Rojo, Puerto Rico
- Died: February 27, 2000 (aged 90); Dominican Republic
- Political party: Puerto Rican Nationalist Party
- Movement: Puerto Rican Independence
- Spouse: Carmen Carreno Martinez
- Children: 6 (Ramón, Neomi, Raquel, Olga, Neida and Rafael)

Casimiro Berenguer Padilla was a Puerto Rican nationalist. He was the military instructor of the Cadets of the Republic (Cadetes de la República) who received permission from Ponce Mayor Tormos Diego to celebrate a parade on March 21, 1937, in commemoration of the abolition of slavery and to protest the jailing of its leaders, including Pedro Albizu Campos. The parade resulted in the police riot known as the Ponce massacre.

External audio
- You may watch newsreel scenes of the Ponce massacre on YouTube

== Early years ==
Casimiro Berenguer Padilla was born in Cabo Rojo, Puerto Rico. His parents were Alejandro Berenguer, a mason, and Eugenia Padilla, a housewife. At age 6, he emigrated to the Dominican Republic with his parents, where he spent his childhood and part of his youth. He also learned to trade as a cobbler there. In 1929, he returned to Puerto Rico and established a shoe repair shop in Ponce.

== Background ==
Berenguer Padilla was an instructor of the Cadets of the Republic in Ponce. He set up his shoe repair shop at Marina and Aurora streets, at a building used by the Puerto Rican Nationalist Party to celebrate its meetings in that city. The Insular Police carried out the 1937 Ponce massacre, under the instructions of US-installed governor Blanton Winship, outside this building.

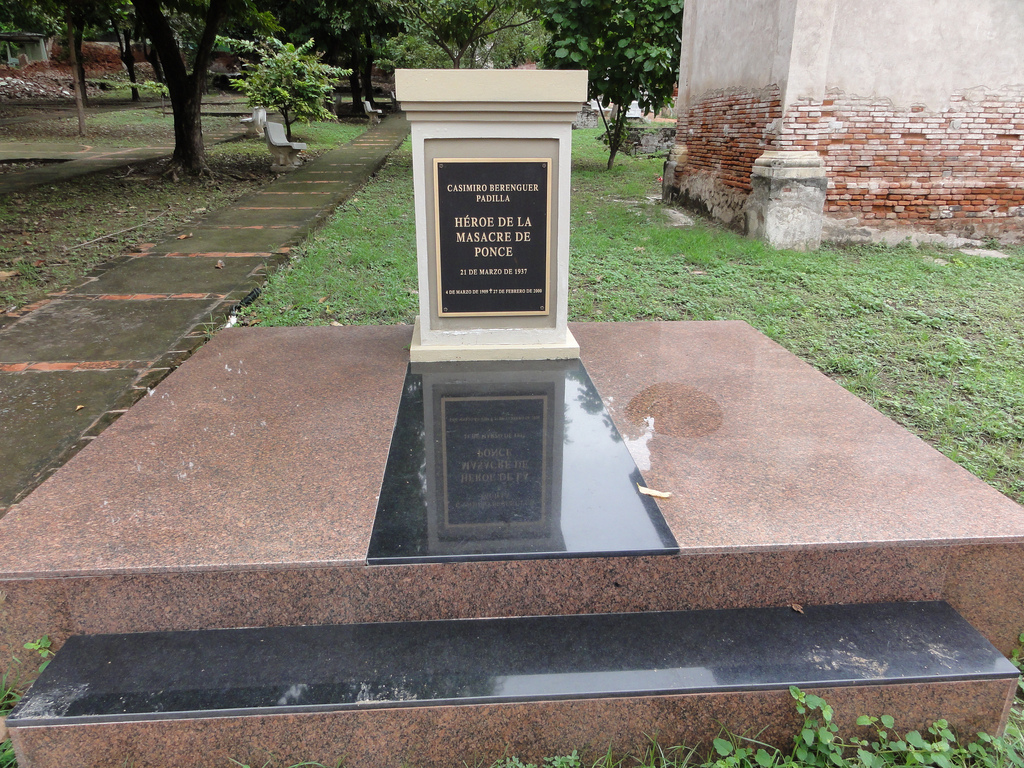
Tomb of Puerto Rican Nationalist Casimiro Berenguer at the Panteon Nacional Roman Baldorioty de Castro in Barrio Segundo in Ponce, Puerto Rico

In 1938, Berenguer and other Nationalists were accused of the murder of Col. Luis Irizarry of the Puerto Rican National Guard, in their attempt on the life of U.S.-installed governor Blanton Winship in retaliation for the Blanton-ordered Ponce massacre. The other Nationalists also accused of murder by the government of Blanton Winship in relation to the massacre were Luis Castro Quesada, Julio Pinto Gandía, Lorenzo Piñeiro, (Interim President and Interim Secretary General of the Puerto Rican Nationalist Party), Plinio Graciani, Tomás López de Victoria, Martín González Ruiz, Elifaz Escobar, Luis Ángel Correa, Santiago González, and Orlando Colón Leyro. Of this group, only Tomás López de Victoria, Santiago González, Elifaz Escobar and Berenguer Padilla were members of the cadets. A grand jury was convened, and the accused were tried, but all the Nationalists, including Berenguer, were released.

On September 28, 1938, Berenguer was convicted with other Nacionalistas in connection with the attempted assassination of Governor Winship (in retaliation for the Ponce massacre) during the celebration of the 40th anniversary of the U.S. military invasion of Puerto Rico. The others convicted were Tomás López de Victoria, Elifaz Escobar, Santiago González, Vicente Morciglio, Leocadio López, Juan Pietri, Guillermo Larrogaiti, and Prudencio Segarra.

== Death and legacy ==
Berenguer died at the age of 90 at his home in the Dominican Republic on February 27, 2000. His remains were interred at the Panteon Nacional Roman Baldorioty de Castro in Ponce on the 70th anniversary of the Ponce massacre, March 21, 2007.

== See also ==
- Cadets of the Republic
- Puerto Rican Independence Movement
- Puerto Rican Nationalist Party Revolts of the 1950s
- Puerto Rican Nationalist Party
- Ponce massacre
- Río Piedras massacre
- Jayuya Uprising
- Utuado Uprising
- Puerto Rican Independence Party
- History of Puerto Rico
- Gilberto Concepción de Gracia
- Blanca Canales
- Lolita Lebrón
