= Banco Crédito y Ahorro Ponceño =

Former bank in Puerto Rico

Coordinates: 18°0′39.816″N 66°36′47.7354″W

- Company type: Private
- Industry: Banking
- Founded: Ponce, Puerto Rico (1895)
- Defunct: 1 April 1978
- Headquarters: Ponce, Puerto Rico
- Key people: Antonio S. Arias Ventura, (1880-1963); General Manager, Service years: 1895-1963
- Products: Credit cards, Savings Accounts, Personal loans, Business loans
- Total assets: $800 million (in 1975)
- Number of employees: 1,500 (in 1975) in 50 branches (in 1975)

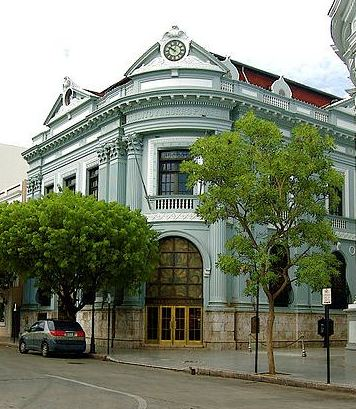
Banco Crédito y Ahorro Ponceño's former main office in downtown Ponce. Its branches, including its main branch above in Ponce, are now branded "Banco Santander". The above branch was Banco Crédito's first and was built in 1924.

Banco Crédito y Ahorro Ponceño (Ponce Credit and Savings Bank) was the first bank in Ponce, Puerto Rico, and one of the first two native Puerto Rican banks to be established in Puerto Rico. The bank was the first one to introduce a bank credit card to the Puerto Rican market. With over 50 branches throughout the island, the bank was one of the largest banking companies in Puerto Rico during most of the twentieth century.

Founded in 1895, Banco Crédito built its own first banking structure in 1924 at Calle Marina and Callejón Amor, in Ponce. This first branch office, located in what is today the Ponce Historic Zone, has since been declared historic and was listed in the National Register of Historic Places.

The bank collapsed in 1978 and was acquired by the Federal Deposit Insurance Corporation. Its accounts and assets were purchased by Banco Popular de Puerto Rico and Banco Santander.

== History ==
Banco Crédito y Ahorro Ponceño was founded on 1 January 1895, and it prospered significantly during the first half of the twentieth century. The bank built its first and main branch in downtown Ponce in 1924, the same that the younger Banco de Ponce had built an equally impressive main office next to Banco Crédito's property. Banco Crédito's prosperity translated into the opening of new branches in other towns in Puerto Rico, at one point having over fifty branches spread across most of the 78 municipalities of Puerto Rico. In 1969, it was also Banco Crédito that introduced the first bank credit card—BankAmericard (now Visa) -- in Puerto Rico.

Despite its achievements, 83 years after its founding, on 1 April 1978, Banco Crédito collapsed and its branches and accounts were sold to Banco Popular de Puerto Rico and to Banco Santander with the assistance of the Federal Deposit Insurance Corporation. Banco Santader acquired 14 of Crédito's branch offices.

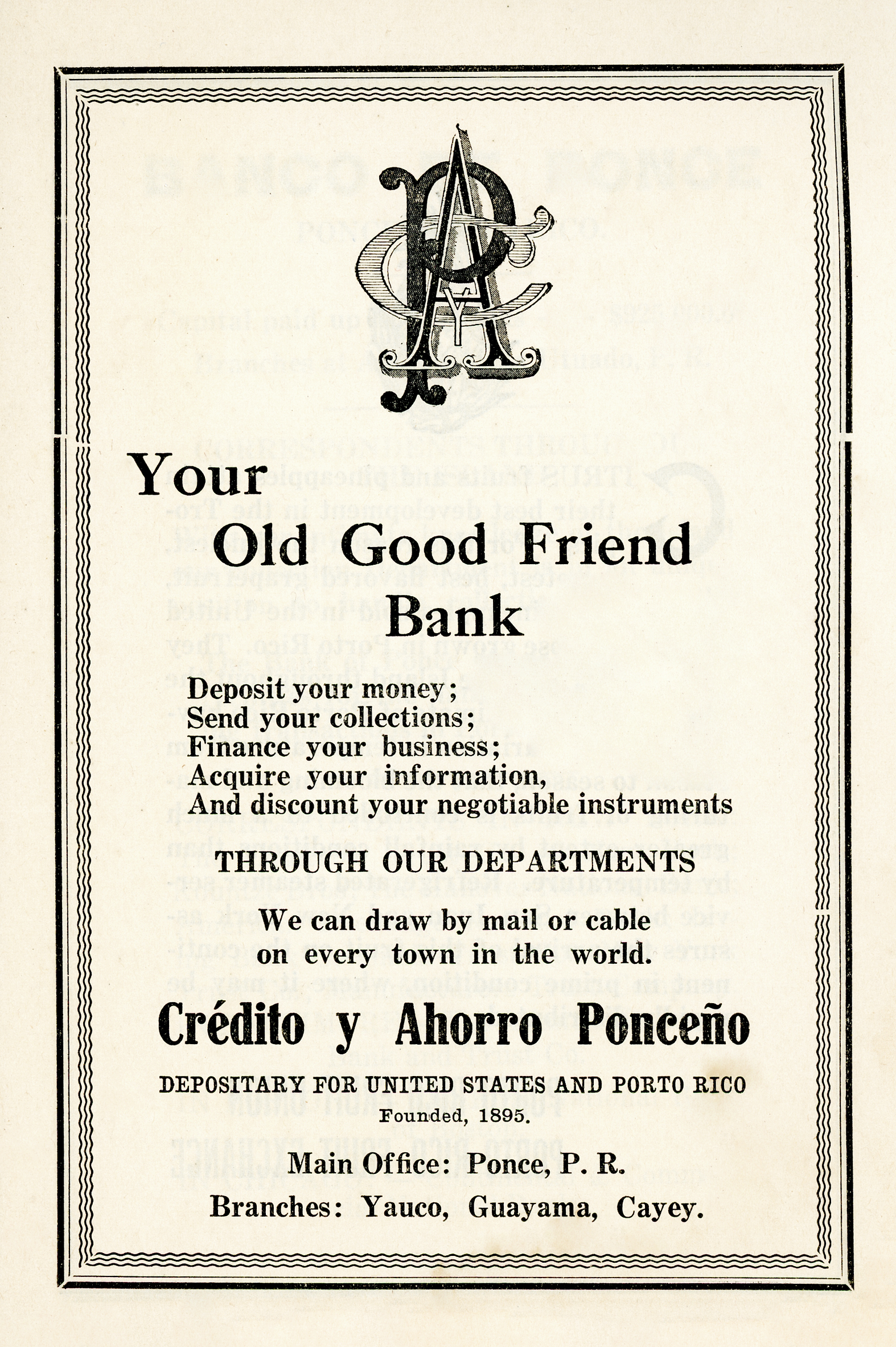
Bank advertisement from 1899

== Location ==
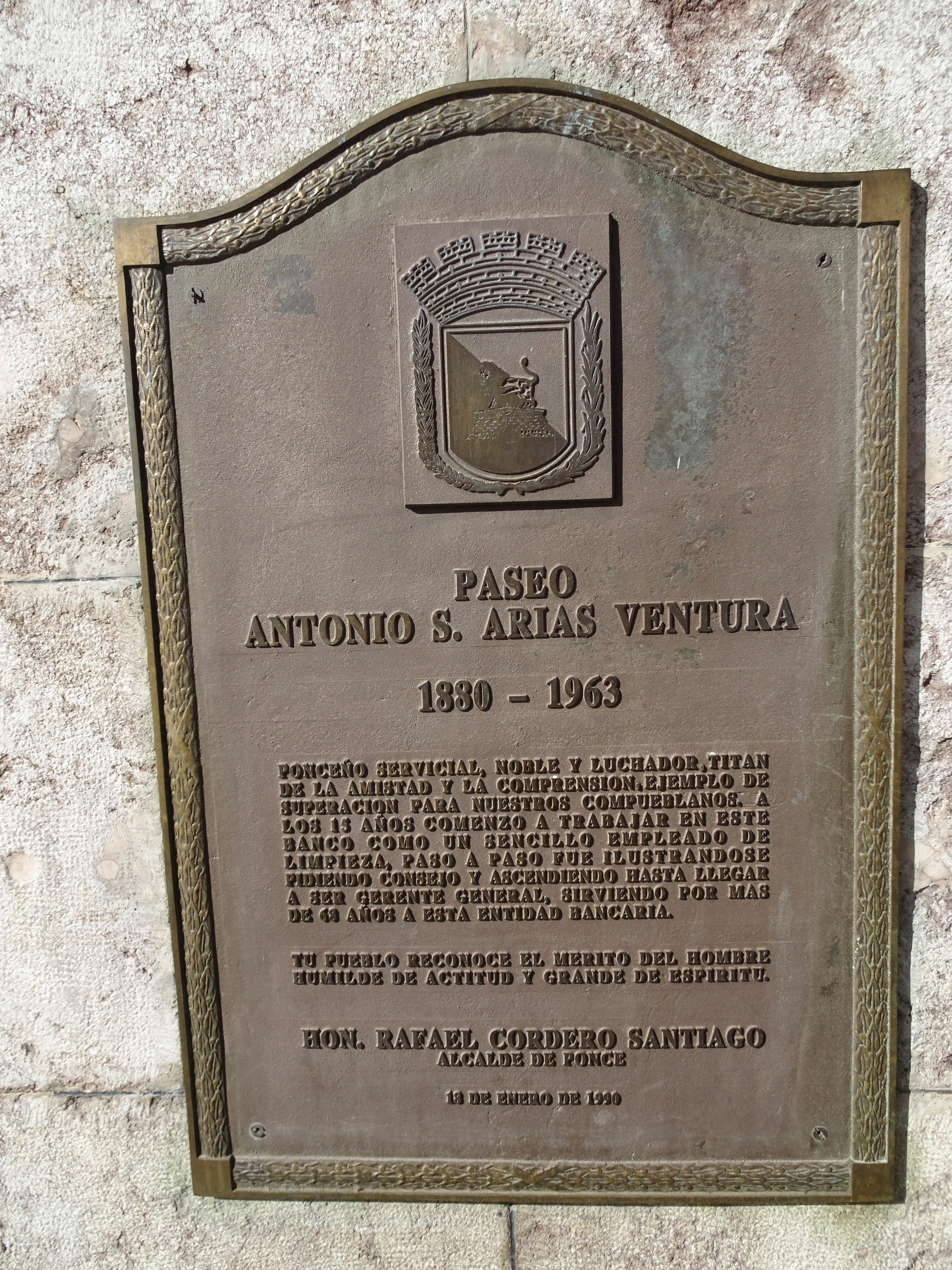
Plaque on Antonio S. Arias Ventura alley

The bank's main office was located on Calle Marina and Paseo Arias (Arias Promenade), facing west towards Plaza Degetau and bounded in the east by Calle Mayor Cantera. The building of the impressive Banco Crédito structure in downtown Ponce was meant to send a message from the local financial institution to the US-based banks that Banco Crédito was ready to market aggressively for the wealth of Puerto Rico's booming sugar economy.: "Banco Crédito's monumental exuberance expresses the pride of the institution, its solidity, and its capacity to hold its own against far more wealthy Stateside institutions competing for the dollars of the local moneyed classes."

=== Antonio S. Arias Ventura ===
Paseo Arias was previously called Callejón Amor (Love Alley). In 1991, Callejón Amor was converted into a promenade and renamed Paseo Antonio S. Arias Ventura, after the long-time employee of Banco Crédito y Ahorro Ponceño who started as a custodian and rose to become the bank's general manager.

== Directors ==
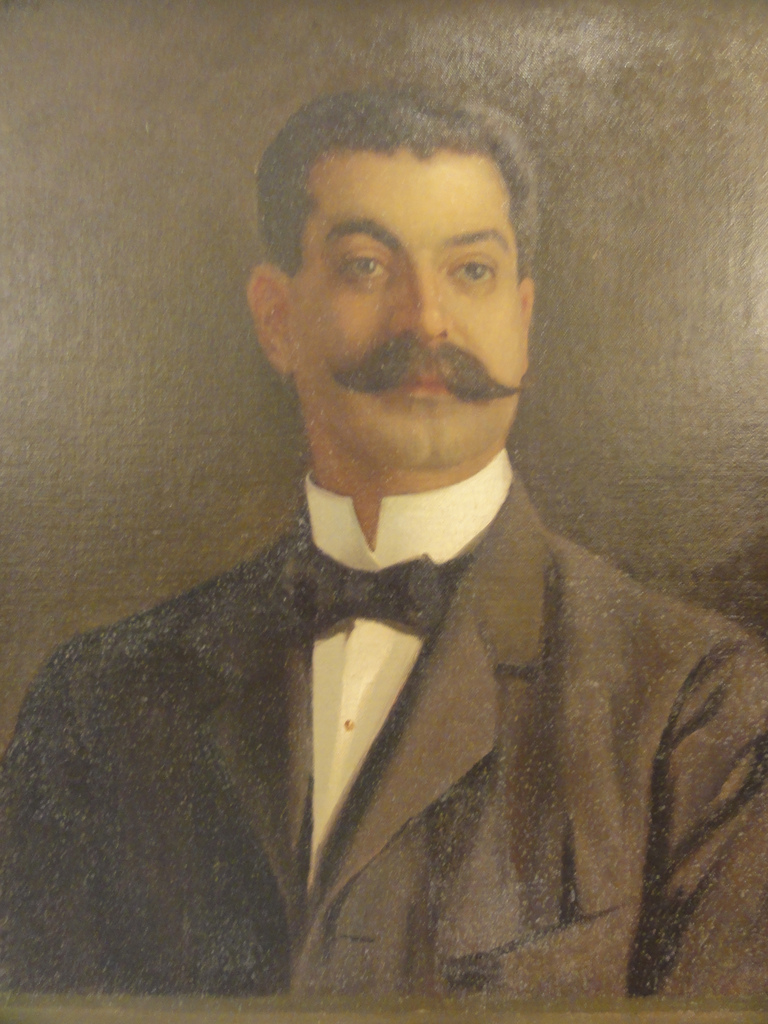
Ulpiano Colóm, co-founder of the institution

Among the directors and officers of this prominent bank were some of the most recognized names in the city of Ponce and Puerto Rico at large, including former Ponce mayor (1898), Ulpiano Colóm. The bank's first president and one of its founders was Francisco Parra Duperón. Ermelindo Salazar was both a director and a Banco Crédito president. Its founders were Lucas Amadeo, Francisco Parra Duperón, and Antonio Frías.

== Motto ==
The bank's 1960s motto was "Banco Crédito y Ahorro Ponceño: el banco del grande y del pequeño." ("Banco Crédito y Ahorro Ponceño: the bank of the big (guy) and the little (guy)").

== Contemporary use ==
Today, Banco Crédito y Ahorro Ponceño's former building in downtown Ponce continues to serve as a bank branch for Banco de Santander, the Spanish concern that bought the assets of Banco Crédito y Ahorro Ponceño in 1978.

== See also ==
- Ponce City Archives
- Banco de Santander Archives
- Porrata Doria Family Archives
- Banco Crédito y Ahorro Ponceño (building)
