= Antonio M. Delgado =

Puerto Rican politician

Mayor-elect of Ponce, Puerto Rico

Personal details
- Died: 1936/1937
- Profession: politician

Antonio M. Delgado was a Puerto Rican politician and mayor-elect of Ponce, Puerto Rico, for the term starting in 1937. However, he died before taking office.

== Mayoral selection ==
Antonio M. Delgado had been elected mayor of Ponce, Puerto Rico in 1936. However he died before taking office. Given this event, Jose Tormos Diego was selected by the standing political party to replace Mr. Delgado.

== See also ==
- List of Puerto Ricans
