= Emilio Fagot =

Puerto Rican politician (1883–1946)

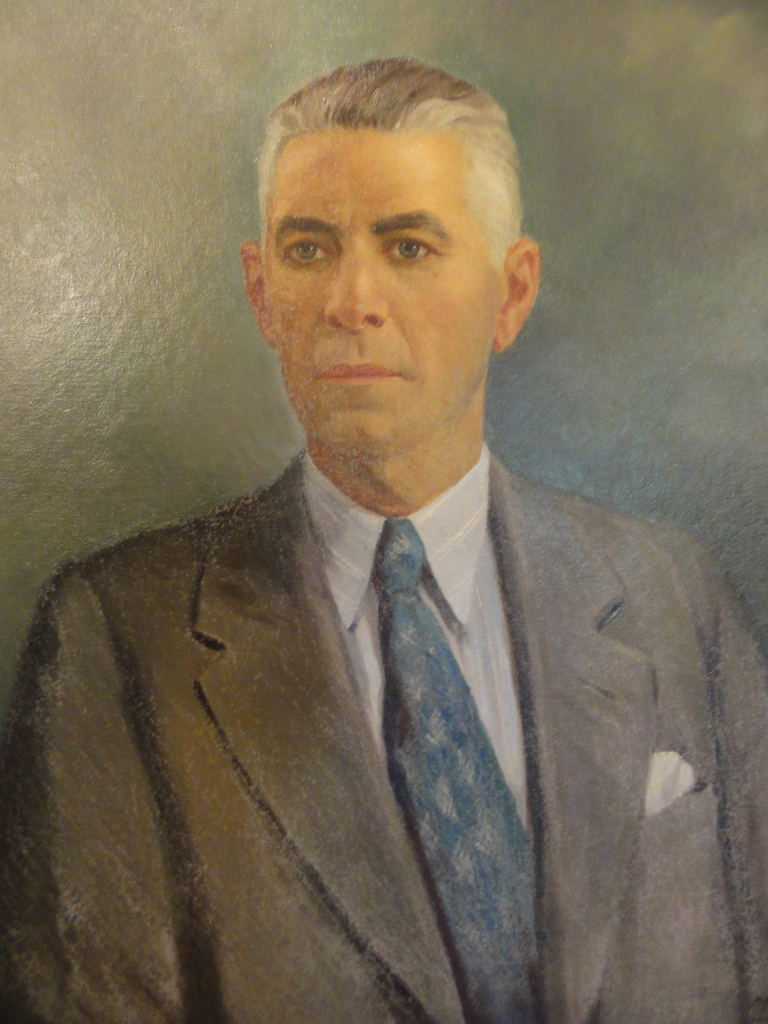
- Mayor Emilio Fagot

119th Mayor of Ponce, Puerto Rico
- In office 1 January 1929 – 1 January 1933
- Preceded by: Guillermo Vivas Valdivieso
- Succeeded by: Blas Oliveras

Personal details
- Born: 2 February 1883 Ponce, Puerto Rico
- Died: 28 January 1946 (aged 62) Ponce, Puerto Rico
- Profession: politician

Emilio Fagot (2 February 1883 – 28 January 1946) was a Puerto Rican politician and Mayor of Ponce, Puerto Rico, from 1 January 1929 to 1 January 1933.

== Early years ==
Fagot was born in Ponce on 2 February 1883 into a family of farmers.

== Career ==
Fagot became interested in politics at a young age and by 1914 (age 30) he was a member of the Ponce Municipal Assembly. He also founded a new political party: Partido Popular Ponceño. Through his party he formed a coalition between the Socialist and Republican parties that led him to winning the 1928 elections and become mayor of Ponce in 1929.

== Presidential visit ==
Emilio Fagot is best known for his welcoming and hosting of US President Herbert Hoover in 1933, during the time of the Great Depression. He has the distinction of being one of three Ponce mayors to have hosted a US President.

== Death and legacy ==
Fagot died on 28 January 1946. In Ponce there is a major thoroughfare named after him.

== See also ==
- Ponce, Puerto Rico
- List of Puerto Ricans

Political offices
Preceded by Guillermo Vivas Valdivieso	Mayor of Ponce, Puerto Rico; 1 January 1929 – 1 January 1933	Succeeded by Blas Oliveras
