= Guillermo Vivas Valdivieso =

Puerto Rican politician

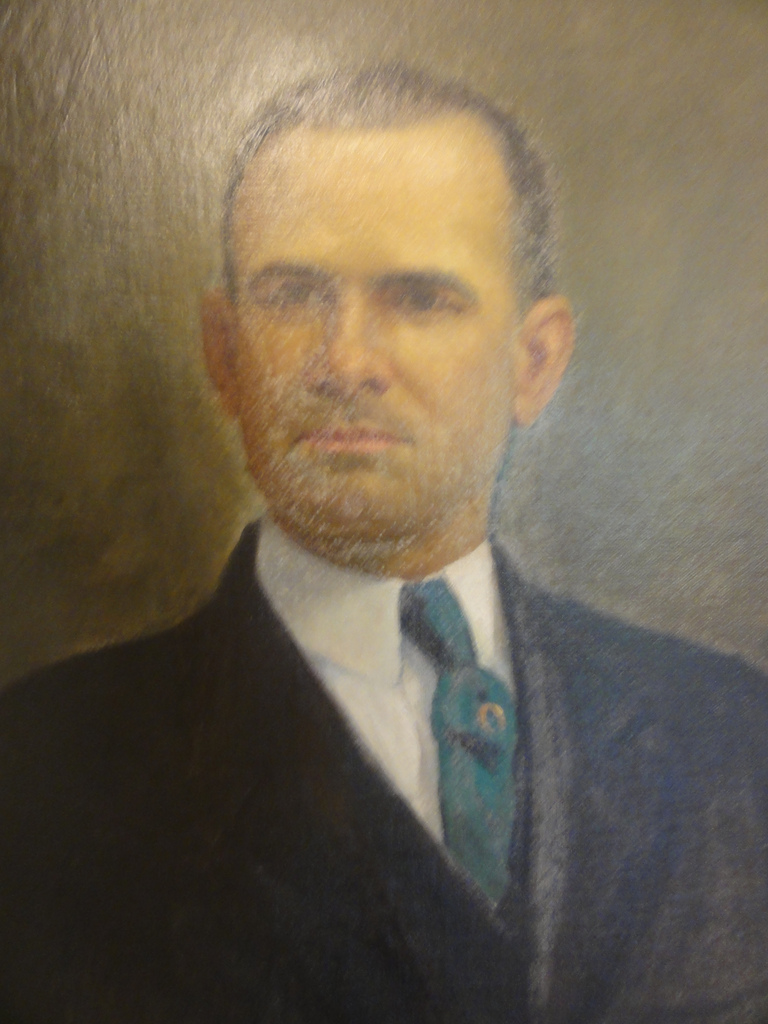
- Mayor Guillermo Vivas Valdivieso

118th Mayor of Ponce, Puerto Rico
- In office 1925–1928
- Preceded by: Abelardo Aguilú, Jr.
- Succeeded by: Emilio Fagot

Personal details
- Born: 10 February 1881 Ponce, Puerto Rico
- Died: 31 January 1965 Primero, Ponce, Puerto Rico
- Resting place: Cementerio Católico San Vicente de Paul
- Occupation: Journalist
- Profession: Attorney

Guillermo Vivas Valdivieso (10 February 1881 – 31 January 1965) was a Puerto Rican attorney, journalist, politician and Mayor of Ponce, Puerto Rico from 1925 to 1928.

== Early years ==
Vivas Valdivieso was born in Ponce, Puerto Rico, on 10 February 1881. He had little formal education and starting to work at 12 years old for Olimpio Otero at his store, Bazar Otero. He later became a legal assistant for a law office, and subsequently a bookkeeper for seven years.

== Journalist ==
At age 14, Vivas Valdivieso founded, together with Alberto Marin and Eduardo Marin, the political autonomist newspaper, La Razon. Subsequently, he also became the owner and director of the "El Día" newspaper during the time of the Ponce massacre at the hands of the Insular Police under the governorship of U.S.-appointed Gov. Blanton Winship. He had purchased the paper from its founder, Guillermo V. Cintrón, in August 1928.

== Mayoral term ==
Vivas Valdivieso is recorded to have been the facilitator of the building of "Modern Ponce". During his administration, he secured a municipal loan of $1,250,000 ($22.9 million in 2025 dollars) for citywide improvements that would turn the municipality of Ponce, come the administration of his successor Emilio Fagot, into the city it became during the rest of the 20th century. Some of the improvements made included the paving of so far dirt city streets, the creation of the city's sewerage system, the enlargement of the old Acueducto, the repair of rural roads, and facilitating the traffic of rural goods into the city market. He is also credited with creating the first network of the city's sewer system.

== Honors ==
He is recognized as one of Ponce's most accomplished journalists at Ponce's Park for Illustrious Ponce Citizens. In Ponce there is a street in Urbanizacion Las Delicias of Barrio Magueyes named after him.

== Death ==
His residence was in Tercero, Ponce, but he died after six days in a hospital in Primero, Ponce, with the Puerto Rico Department of Health listing Bronchopneumonia as the cause of death. He was buried at Cementerio Católico San Vicente de Paul in Ponce.

== See also ==
- Ponce, Puerto Rico
- List of Puerto Ricans

Political offices
Preceded by Abelardo Aguilú, Jr.	Mayor of Ponce, Puerto Rico; 1925–1928	Succeeded by Emilio Fagot
