= Panteón Nacional Román Baldorioty de Castro =

Cemetery and museum in Ponce, Puerto Rico

- Cementerio Antiguo de Ponce
- U.S. National Register of Historic Places
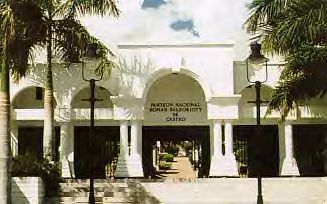
- The Panteón Nacional Román Baldorioty de Castro, previously known as Cementerio Antiguo de Ponce (looking north)

- Location within Puerto Rico
- Location: Calle Torre no. 1 and Calle Frontispicio, Ponce, Puerto Rico
- Coordinates: 18°00′57″N 66°37′04″W
- Area: 3.7 acres (1.5 ha)
- Built: 1842
- Architect: Antonio Torruella (1842); Nieto Blajol Iglesia (1864 project)
- Architectural style: Neoclassical
- NRHP reference No.: 84003149
- Added to NRHP: 5 January 1984

Panteón Nacional Román Baldorioty de Castro
- Location in Puerto Rico
- Established: 1992
- Location: Torres no. 1 &Frontispicio St., Ponce, Puerto Rico
- Type: Cemetery Museum
- Visitors: 17,567 (2000)
- Owner: Autonomous Municipality of Ponce

The Panteón Nacional Román Baldorioty de Castro (English: Román Baldorioty de Castro National Pantheon) is a tract of land in Barrio Segundo of the city of Ponce, Puerto Rico, originally designed as the city's cemetery, but later converted into what has come to be a famous burial place. Established in 1842, it is Puerto Rico's first (and only) national pantheon. It is the only cemetery dedicated as a museum in Puerto Rico and the Caribbean. Prior to being dedicated as a Panteón Nacional, it was known as Cementerio Viejo or as Cementerio Antiguo de Ponce, (Note: See, for example, Puerto Rico, Civil Registrations, 1885–2001. Registro Civil, 1836–2001. Digital images. Departamento de Salud de Puerto Rico, San Juan, Puerto Rico.) and is listed under that name on the U.S. National Register of Historic Places. The Pantheon is named after Román Baldorioty de Castro, a prolific Puerto Rican politician, and firm believer of Puerto Rican autonomy and independence. His remains are located here. The Pantheon also houses a small museum about the history of autonomism in the Island, and it is currently used both as a park and a venue for the expression of culture and the arts. It is called the Museo del Autonomismo Puertorriqueño.

Prior to being turned into a National Pantheon in 1991, it was known as Antiguo Cementerio de Ponce (Ponce's Old Cemetery), to differentiate it from the newer (though now also over 100 years old) Cementerio Civil de Ponce (Ponce Civil Cemetery). Built in 1842, after the design of Antonio Torruella, the cemetery was enlarged in 1864, following the design of Nieto Blajol Iglesia. It closed in 1918.

== History ==
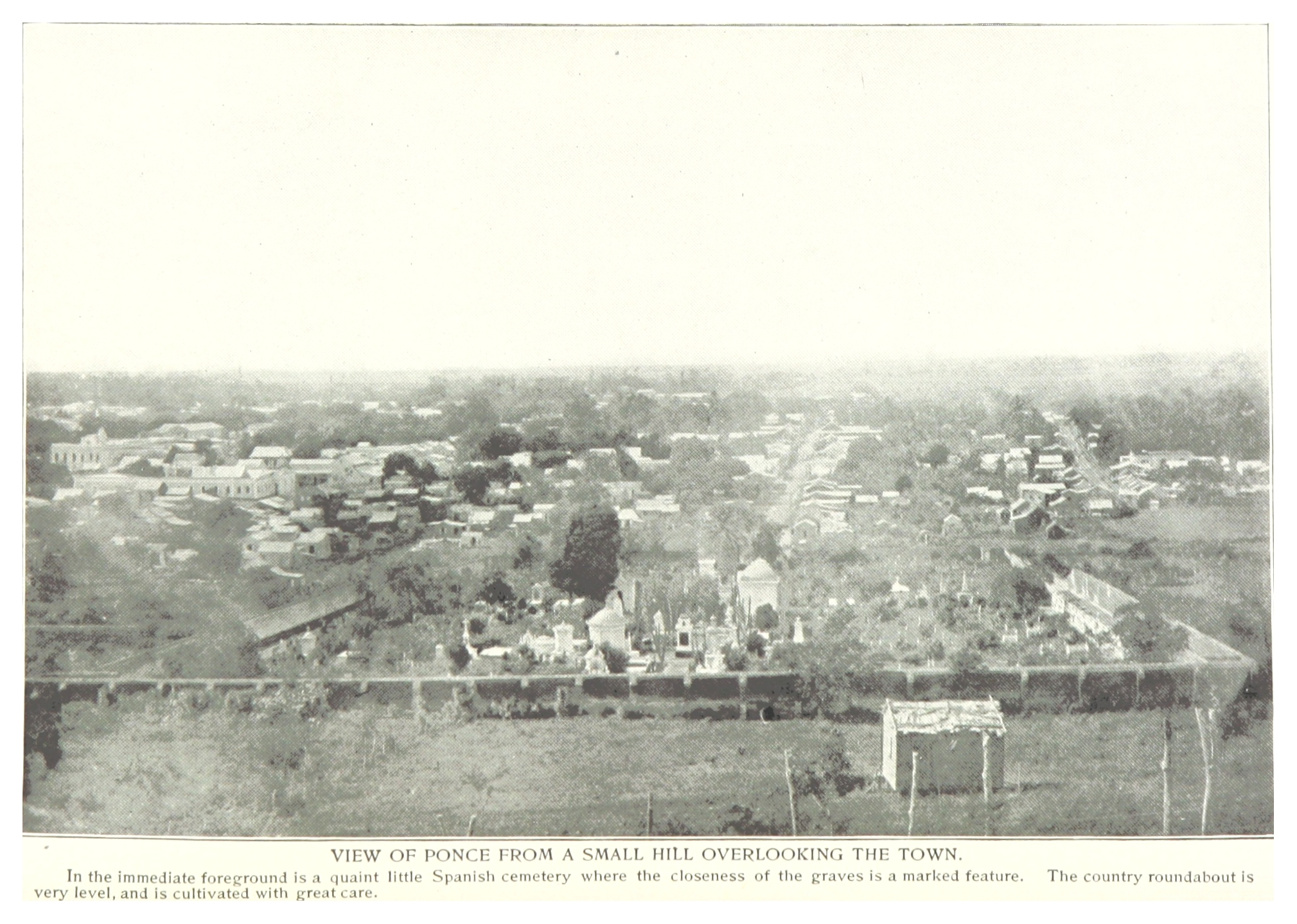
View of the Panteon, circa 1890s (looking south)

On 13 February 1838, the secretary of the Municipality of Ponce met with civic leaders of the "Villa of Ponce" to discuss plans for building a new cemetery. The existing cemetery was in deplorable and bad condition, and it posed a danger to public health. Because the "Villa of Ponce" did not have the money to build the cemetery, a voluntary proportional contribution was established in which all neighbors were to contribute. A commission was named composed of one member of the Municipal Council and four neighbors of influence to open up a voluntary subscription, name a depository and to proceed with the construction of the cemetery until its completion. The project was to be carried out in a lot adjacent to the existing cemetery extending one hundred square "varas" (a measure of length equal to 0.84m. approximately). Named by vote to form the commission were the "Sor Sindico" '(secretary to the mayor of the "Villa") and the neighbor leaders Don Geronimo Ortiz, Don Tomas Souffront, Don Luis Font, and Don Mateo Maenamaxe. On 26 February 1838, the project was approved by the mayor of Ponce. However, it was not until 1842 that the project was started out with the contributions of the neighbors of the "Villa". In 1843, the cemetery was inaugurated under the auspices of the mayor of Ponce, Don Juan Rondon Martinez, also the first person to be buried there. In 1864 the cemetery was enlarged and repaired. The new work consisted of repairs and construction of the enclosing walls and pathways, construction of new niches and construction of a chapel and mortuary. In 1915 the cemetery was closed down.

== Architecture and construction ==
The cemetery consisted of well-designed small mausoleums that were lined up following a central pathway followed by lateral ones, starting from the entrance of the cemetery to a chapel located at the end. Most structures were designed and constructed following the neoclassical style that prevailed at that time. This style consisted of the use of columns and pilasters following the Doric, Ionic or Corinthian order, barrel vaults, Greek pediments, Roman arches and other details characteristic of said style. The thick walls and piers were built using brick, mortar, and "argamasa" (a mixture of crushed brick, sand, stone aggregate and lime). The enclosing walls were built of brick and mortar, and the part of the walls built in 1864 were built using stone and mortar. It was built in 1842 and enlarged in 1864.

== Significance ==
Various illustrious Puerto Ricans of transcendental importance are buried here. The most important person buried in the cemetery is Don Román Baldorioty de Castro, distinguished patriot, journalist, educator, writer, orator, and abolitionist. In 1870, he was elected delegate to the Courts of Cadiz, where he opposed the slavery system of the time. He was responsible for most of the liberty amendments. On 23 March 1873, the abolition of slavery was proclaimed by Baldorioty de Castro.

Also buried there are Don Juan Seix, founder of the Ponce Fire Department, and Don Juan Rondon Martinez, mayor of Ponce (founder of the cemetery and first person buried in it). Another prominent mayor buried there is Salvador de Vives, who founded Hacienda Buena Vista. Other people buried in the cemetery include Juan Morel Campos and Manuel G. Tavarez, distinguished composers and musicians, most famous for their danzas (folkloric music typical of Puerto Rico) compositions, and tenor of kings Antonio Paoli. It houses the remains of nationalist hero Casimiro Berenguer, and members of the prominent Seralles family, founders of the Destileria Serralles, and after whom the Castillo Serralles took its name. Ex-governor Roberto Sanchez Vilella's tomb is also buried there and the late mayor of Ponce, Rafael Cordero Santiago, has a mausoleum there.

== Physical appearance ==
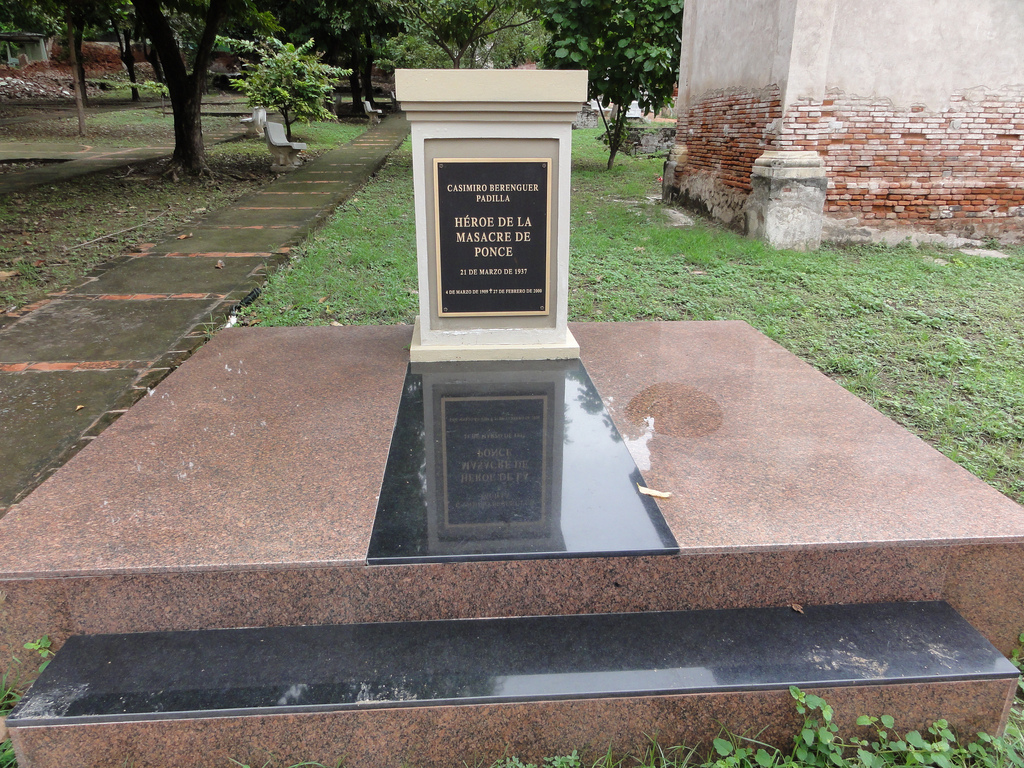
Tomb of Puerto Rican Nationalist Casimiro Berenguer-Padilla at the Panteón Nacional

The cemetery plan is shaped as a rectangle measuring approximately 157.71 meters in length by 84.31 meters wide. It is attached to a rectangular-shaped lot at the north-east corner measuring about 32.80 meters in length by 25.03 meters wide, and a small rectangular lot where the mortuary used to be located, at the center of the south side of cemetery measuring about 14.13 meters wide by 8.97 meters in length.

A small mortuary structure building used to stand at the entrance of the cemetery. Following this structure, small mausoleums, crypts and niches were lined up on a central pathway that led to a small chapel located at the center of the cemetery. The cemetery was totally enclosed by very high walls that still remain. Most mausoleums and crypts were constructed following the neo-classical style trend that prevailed at the time. Thick walls and piers were used as the main structural system. These were constructed using brick/"argarnasa", stone and mortar.

The cemetery was closed in 1915 and it deteriorated since then. By 1984, it became subjected to vandalism; crypts and mausoleums were plundered. On that year, it contained a variety of mausoleums, crypts and niches partially destroyed, and most of the cemetery was covered by heavy vegetation. The enclosing wall plaster had fallen down exposing the brick and stone to weather conditions.

Around 1990, the city of Ponce managed to salvage it. It repaired and reconstructed it, turning it into a National Pantheon. The architect in charge if its 1991 design was Virgilio Monsanto. The cemetery was at that time called Cementerio Viejo (English: Old Cemetery), but it was renamed Panteón Nacional Román Baldorioty de Castro (English: Román Baldorioty de Castro National Pantheon). The city of Ponce also established a small museum about autonomism. The city has also commissioned the Pontifical Catholic University of Puerto Rico School of Architecture to perform a study to determine the viability and cost for the total reconstruction of the Pantheon.

== Current use ==
The cemetery is not active for the burial of just-deceased people as it does not have an order by the Puerto Rico Department of Health to operate in that way due to the propensity of the terrain for landslides. Instead, it is used to transfer remains after a period of five years has lapsed. As of April 2014, the most-recently transferred remains were those of Madeleine Velasco Alvarado in 2008, Rafael Cordero Santiago in 2004, and Simon Moret Gallart in 1998. In April 2014 the possibility of interment of the remains of Cheo Feliciano was being considered. Ponce Mayor Maria Melendez stated she would issue a municipal order to transfer Feliciano's remains to the Panteon, if possible after one year.

== See also ==
- Cementerio Católico San Vicente de Paul
- Museo del Autonomismo Puertorriqueño
- Cementerio Civil de Ponce
