= José Tormos Diego =

Puerto Rican politician

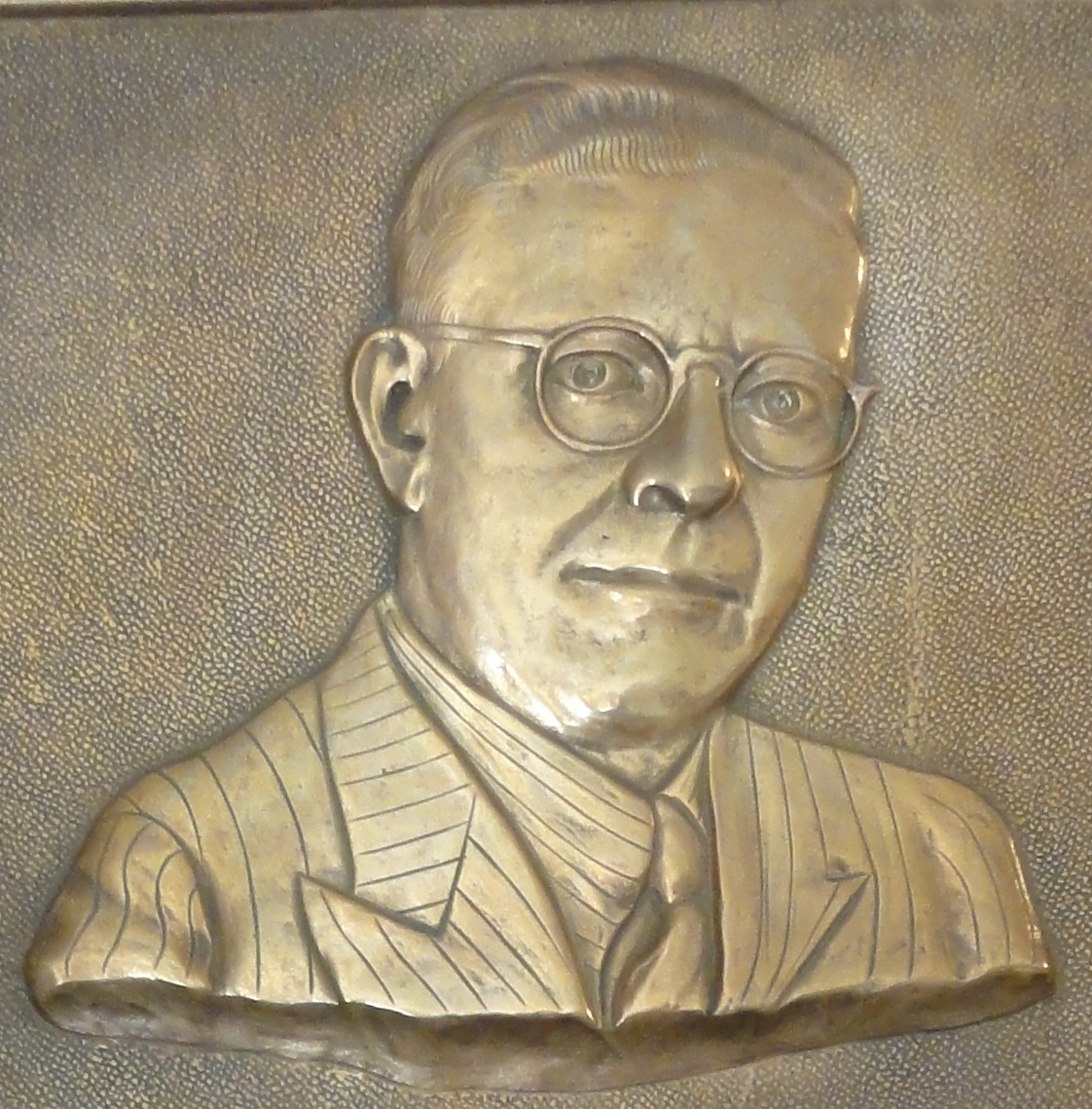
- Mayor José Tormos Diego

121st Mayor of Ponce, Puerto Rico
- In office 1937–1941
- Preceded by: Blas Oliveras
- Succeeded by: Andrés Grillasca Salas

Personal details
- Born: 2 November 1890 Bayamón, Puerto Rico
- Died: 24 August 1977 Ponce, Puerto Rico
- Spouse: Amparo Vega
- Children: Carmen Amparo, Nelida Mercedes, Ana Luisa, Aida, José, and Gloria.
- Profession: Industrial Engineer

José Valentin Tormos Diego (2 November 1890 – 24 August 1977) was a Puerto Rican politician and Mayor of Ponce, Puerto Rico, from 1937 to 1941. He is best remembered for under his administration the Puerto Rican Nationalist Party received a permit for a peaceful march, which resulted in the Ponce massacre by Insular Police under authority supplied by US President Franklin Delano Roosevelt to Governor Blanton Winship. During his administration he also rebuilt the historic Teatro La Perla, and reconditioned the Teatro La Perla northern annex to be used as headquarters of the municipal public library.

== Early years ==
Tormos Diego was the son of Joaquin Tormos and Catalina Diego. Tormos Diego married Amparo Vega Nevárez on 25 September 1911, in Vega Alta, Puerto Rico, and they had 6 children: Carmen Amparo, Nelida Mercedes, Ana Luisa, Aida, José, and Gloria. One of his children, José G. Tormos Vega, was also mayor of Ponce.

== Mayoral selection ==
Antonio M. Delgado had been elected mayor of Ponce, Puerto Rico in 1936. However he died before taking office. Jose Tormos Diego was selected by the standing political party to replace Mr. Delgado.

== Mayoral term ==
Tormos fell ill of appendicitis during his second year as mayor, in July 1938, and had surgery at a Washington, D.C., area hospital.

Tormos Diego is best known for under his administration the Puerto Rican Nationalist Party received a permit for a peaceful march, which resulted in the Ponce massacre by Insular Police under authority supplied by US President Franklin Delano Roosevelt to Governor Blanton Winship.

== Death and legacy ==
Tormos Diego died on 24 August 1977. The cause of his death was "cirrhosis of the liver", and he was buried at Cementerio Católico San Vicente de Paul in Ponce.

During his mayoral administration he rebuilt the historic Teatro La Perla in 1940. During the project he also reconditioned the Teatro La Perla northern annex to be used as headquarters of the municipal public library. In Ponce there is also a public housing development named after him.

== See also ==
- Ponce, Puerto Rico
- List of Puerto Ricans

Political offices
Preceded by Blas Oliveras	Mayor of Ponce, Puerto Rico; 1937–1941	Succeeded by Andrés Grillasca Salas
