= Blas Oliveras =

Puerto Rican politician

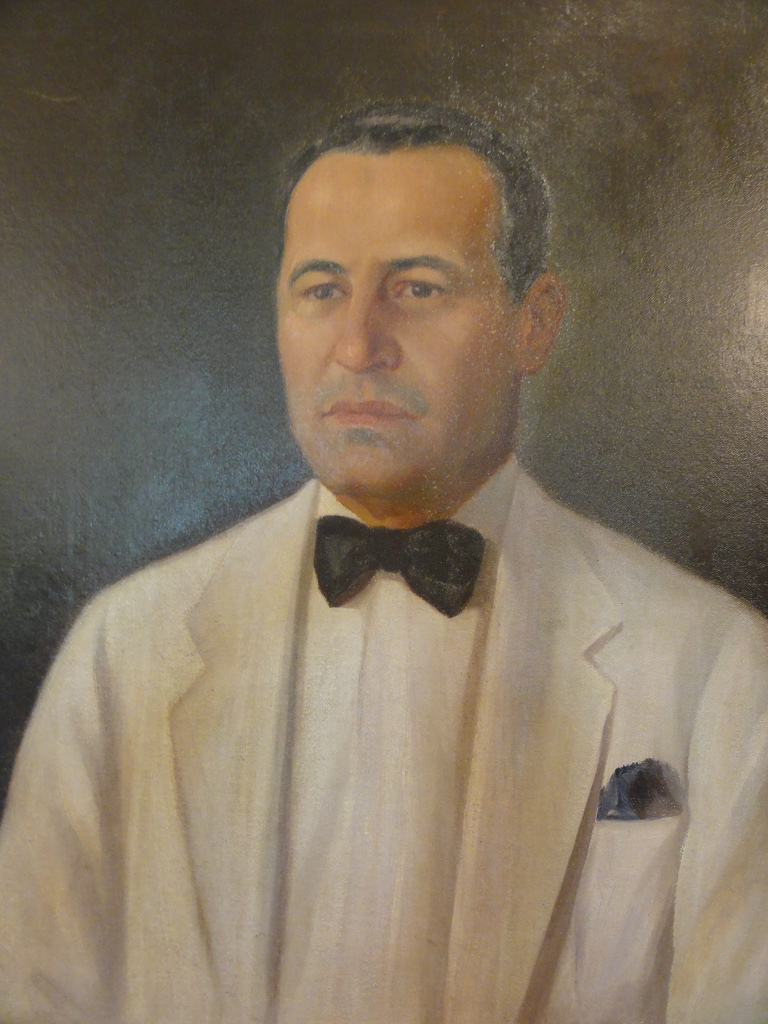
- Mayor Blas Oliveras Mercado

120th Mayor of Ponce, Puerto Rico
- In office 1933–1937
- Preceded by: Emilio Fagot
- Succeeded by: José Tormos Diego

Personal details
- Profession: politician

Blas Oliveras Mercado (c. 1880 – c. 1950) was a Puerto Rican politician and Mayor of Ponce, Puerto Rico, from 1933 to 1937.

== Honors ==
Oliveras Mercado is honored at Ponce's Park of Illustrious Ponce Citizens. Only six others, of over 100 former Ponce mayors, are honored there. In 1950, a bridge in Ponce was named after Blas Silva.

== See also ==
- List of Puerto Ricans
- List of mayors of Ponce, Puerto Rico

Political offices
Preceded by Emilio Fagot	Mayor of Ponce, Puerto Rico; 1933-1937	Succeeded by José Tormos Diego
