= Abelardo Aguilú Jr. =

Puerto Rican politician

117th Mayor of Ponce, Puerto Rico
- In office 1924–1925
- Preceded by: Francisco Parra Capó
- Succeeded by: Guillermo Vivas Valdivieso

Personal details
- Born: ca. 1874 Ponce
- Profession: Shopkeeper

Abelardo Aguilú Jr. (c. 1870 – c. 1940) was Mayor of Ponce, Puerto Rico, from 1924 to 1925. Prior to that he was a shopkeeper in Ponce, selling groceries, liquor, and tobacco.

== See also ==
- Ponce, Puerto Rico
- List of Puerto Ricans

Political offices
| Preceded by Francisco Parra Capó | Mayor of Ponce, Puerto Rico; 1924–1925 | Succeeded by Guillermo Vivas Valdivieso |
