= Francisco Parra Capó =

Mayor of Ponce, Puerto Rico

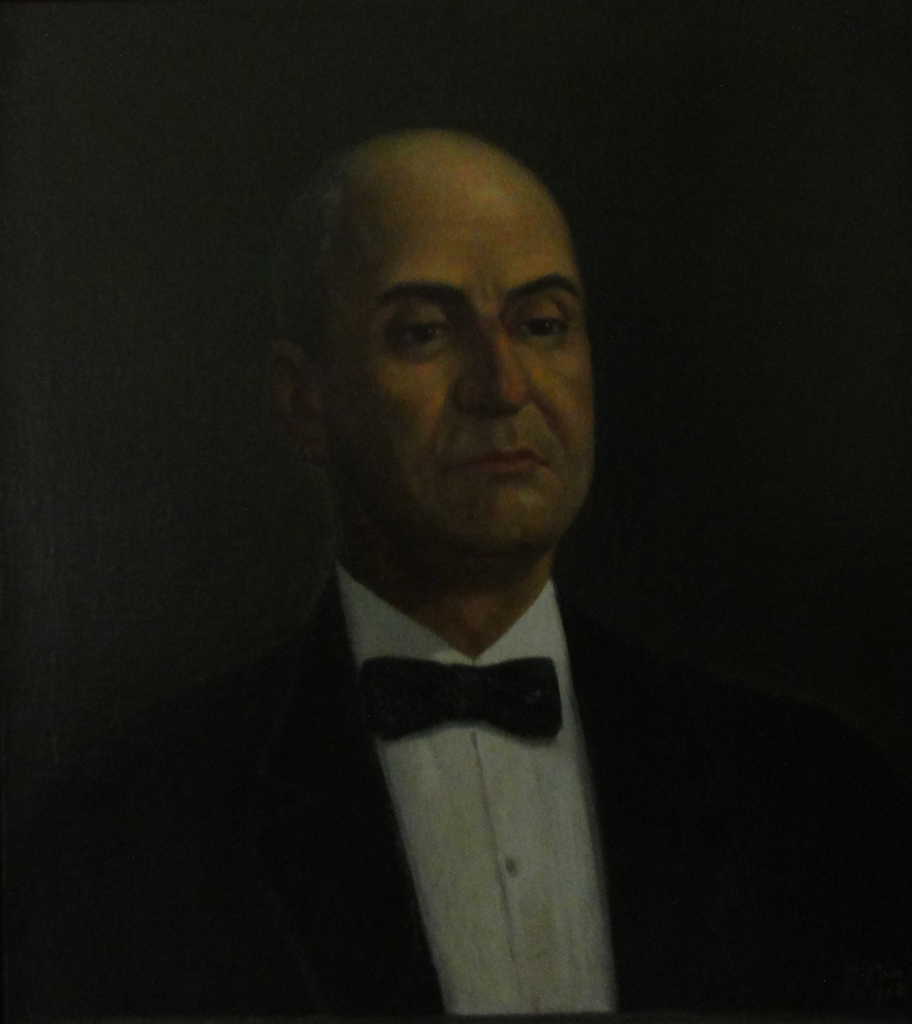
- Mayor Francisco Parra Capó

116th Mayor of Ponce, Puerto Rico
- In office 1921–1923
- Preceded by: Rodulfo del Valle
- Succeeded by: Abelardo Aguilú, Jr.

Personal details
- Born: 20 December 1871 Ponce, Puerto Rico
- Died: ca. 1945
- Party: Republicano Puertorriqueño
- Profession: Attorney

Francisco Parra Capó (20 December 1871 – ca. 1945) was a Puerto Rican attorney, politician, and Mayor of Ponce, Puerto Rico, from 1921 to 1923.

== Early years ==
Francisco Parra Capó was born in Ponce in 1867, the son of Francisco Parra Duperón and Eufemia Constanza Capó Ortiz de la Renta Bermudas. (Note: Other sources, such as Ancestry.com, state he was born on 2 January 1875)

== Professional life ==
In 1900 he was elected to the Puerto Rico House of Delegates for the district of Ponce and served until the end of his term in 1902.

In 1919, he worked as the Archivero General (Archivist-in-Chief) for the Ponce District. He became an attorney and joined his father's law firm in Ponce. The law firm, known as Parra, del Valle & Limeres, operated until 2016 from the Banco de Ponce Building. At the time of its closing, it was the oldest law firm in Puerto Rico. As an attorney, Parra Capó subsequently worked as a military aid to governor Blanton Winship in the mid to late 1930s with his nephew Francisco Parra Toro.

Parra Capó was president of the Ponce Municipal Assembly when the Ponce massacre took place on March 21, 1937.

== See also ==
- Ponce, Puerto Rico
- List of Puerto Ricans

== Notes ==
Political offices
Preceded by Rodulfo del Valle	Mayor of Ponce, Puerto Rico; 1921–1923	Succeeded by Abelardo Aguilú, Jr.
