= Segundo, Ponce, Puerto Rico =

Barrio of Puerto Rico

Segundo
- Barrio
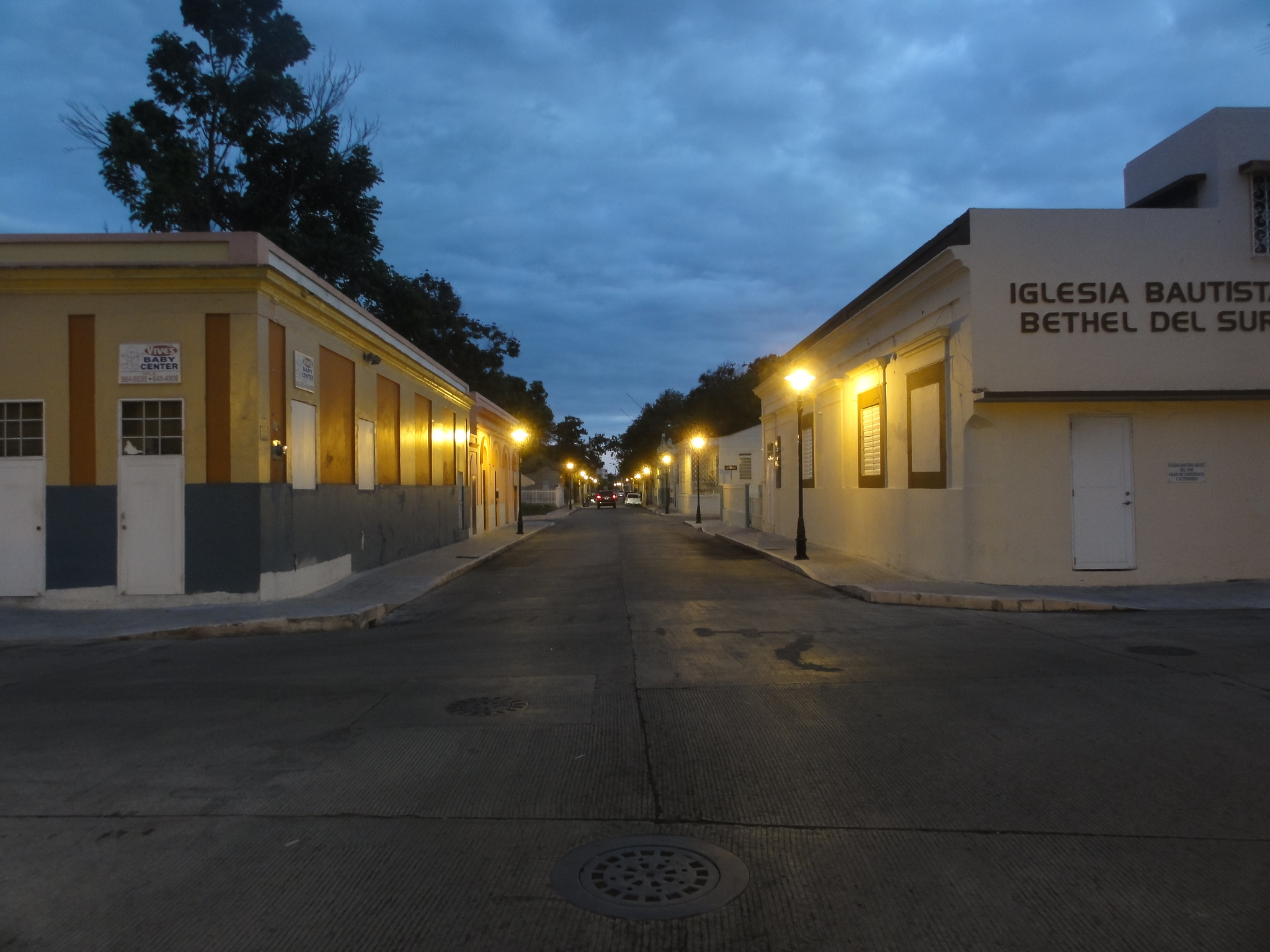
- A street in Barrio Segundo at dusk, in the Ponce Historic Zone

- Location of barrio Segundo within the municipality of Ponce shown in red

- Location of Puerto Rico
- Coordinates: 18°00′52″N 66°37′15″W
- Commonwealth: Puerto Rico
- Municipality: Ponce

Area
  - Total: 0.53 sq mi (1.4 km^{2})
  - Land: 0.53 sq mi (1.4 km^{2})
  - Water: 0 sq mi (0 km^{2})
- Elevation: 85 ft (26 m)

Population (2010)
  - Total: 7,213
  - Density: 13,609.4/sq mi (5,254.6/km^{2})
- Source: 2010 Census
- Time zone: UTC−4 (AST)

Segundo (Barrio Segundo) is one of the 31 barrios of the municipality of Ponce, Puerto Rico. Along with Primero, Tercero, Cuarto, Quinto, and Sexto, Segundo is one of the municipality's six core urban barrios. It was organized in 1878. Barrio Segundo has 3 subbarrios: Baldority de Castro (or just "Baldorioty"), Clausells, (Note: According to Eduardo Questell Rodriguez, Pedro Clausells (ca. 1840 - ca. 1910) was a land surveyor from Ponce (See Eduardo Questell Rodriguez, Historia de la Comunidad Bélgica de Ponce, a partir de la Hacienda Muñiz y Otros datos. Ponce, Puerto Rico: Editores Mariana. 2018. pages 59-60.) He may have been a member of the family that owned Finca Clausells located in the subbarrio by that name (see Office of Head Start - Grantee Profile. Current Legally Approved Service Area: Municipality of Ponce, Puerto Rico. HERE).) and Reparada.

== Location ==
Segundo is an urban barrio located in the southern section of the municipality, within the Ponce city limits, and northwest of the traditional center of the city, Plaza Las Delicias.

== Boundaries ==
Barrio Segundo is bounded on the North by Cinco Street, Pico Dulce Street, and Paseo de la Cruceta, on the South by Villa Street, on the West by Global Street, and on the East by Atocha, Plaza Munoz Rivera, and Plaza Degetau Streets.

In terms of barrio-to-barrio boundaries, Segundo is bounded in the North by Portugués Urbano, in the South by Primero and Canas Urbano, in the West by Canas Urbano, and in the East by Sexto, Quinto, and Tercero.

The communities of Clausells, Ferran, and Tamarindo are located in Segundo.

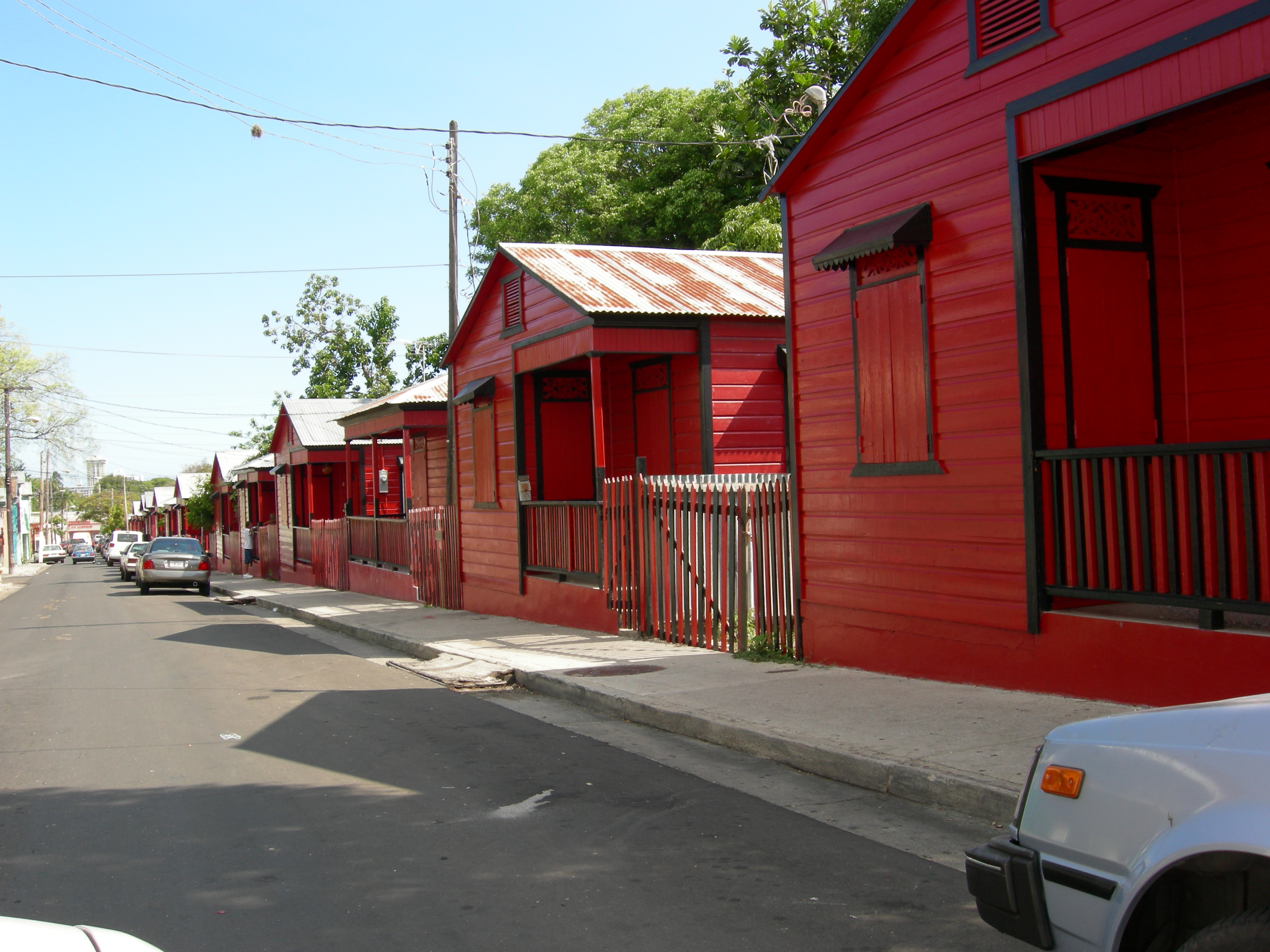
25 de Enero Street, built for the families of Ponce firefighters in the nineteenth century, is located in Barrio Segundo

== Features and demographics ==
Segundo has 0.6 square miles (1.6 km^{2}) of land area and no water area. In 2000, the population of Segundo was 11,321. In 2010, the population of Segundo was 7,213 persons, and it had a density of 13,609.4 persons per square mile.

Historical population
Census	Pop.	Note	%±
1900	5,866		—
1910	10,657		81.7%
1920	13,886		30.3%
1930	18,544		33.5%
1940	26,022		40.3%
1950	25,941		−0.3%
1960	23,481		−9.5%
1970	19,541		−16.8%
1980	13,555		−30.6%
1990	11,072		−18.3%
2000	11,321		2.2%
2010	7,213		−36.3%
U.S. Decennial Census; 1899 (shown as 1900) 1910-1930; 1930-1950 1960 1980-2000 2010

== Notable landmarks ==
Segundo is home to a large number of Ponce's landmarks and historic sites. Plaza Las Delicias, 25 de Enero Street, and Paseo Atocha, are located there.

The NRHP-listed Parque de Bombas, Nuestra Señora de la Guadalupe Cathedral, Armstrong-Poventud Residence, Casa Wiechers-Villaronga (Architecture Museum), Panteón Nacional Román Baldorioty de Castro, Albergue Caritativo Tricoche, Casa Miguel C. Godreau, and Subira House are all located in Barrio Segundo.

== Gallery ==
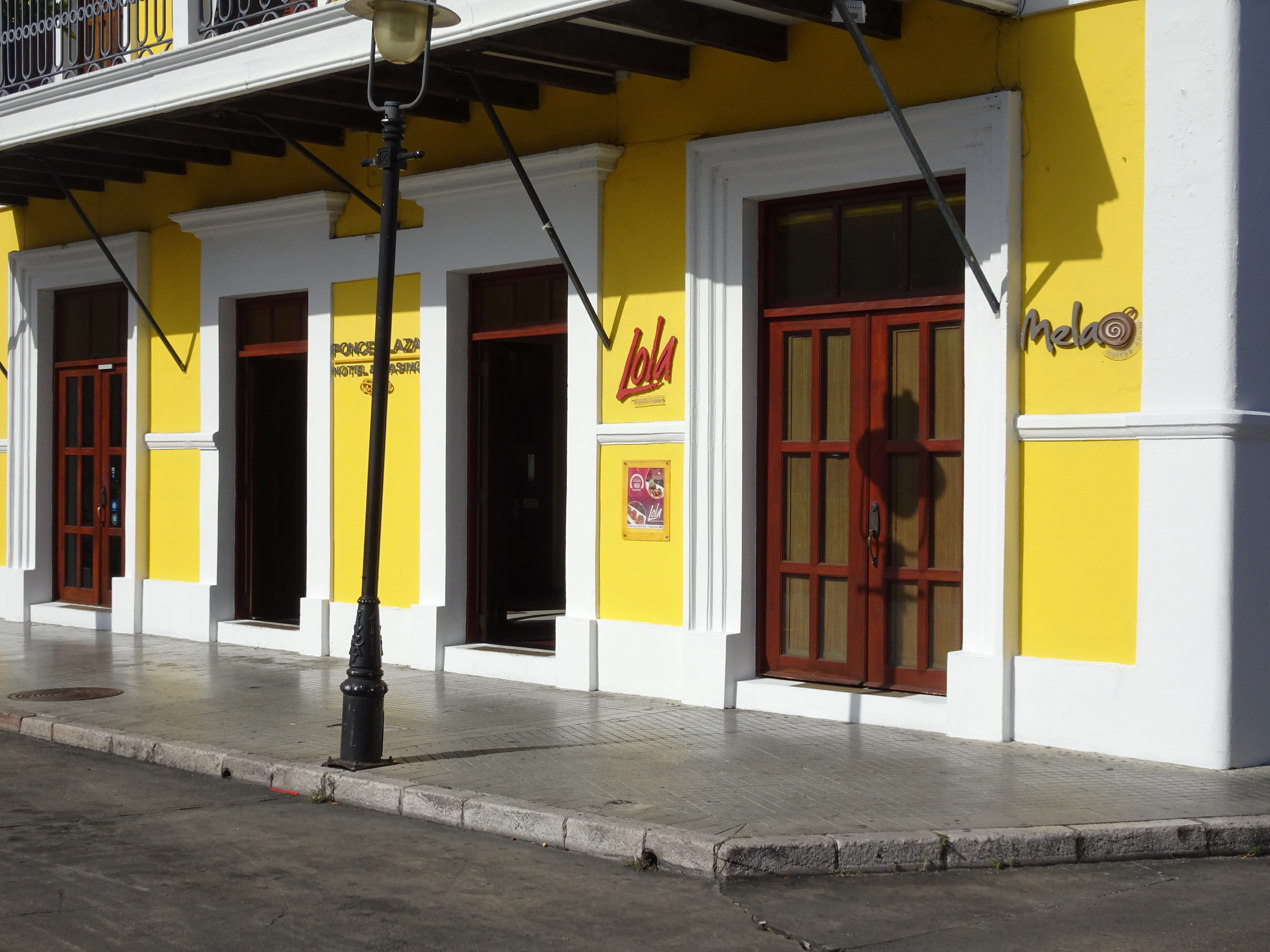
International food restaurants at the Ponce Plaza Hotel & Casino

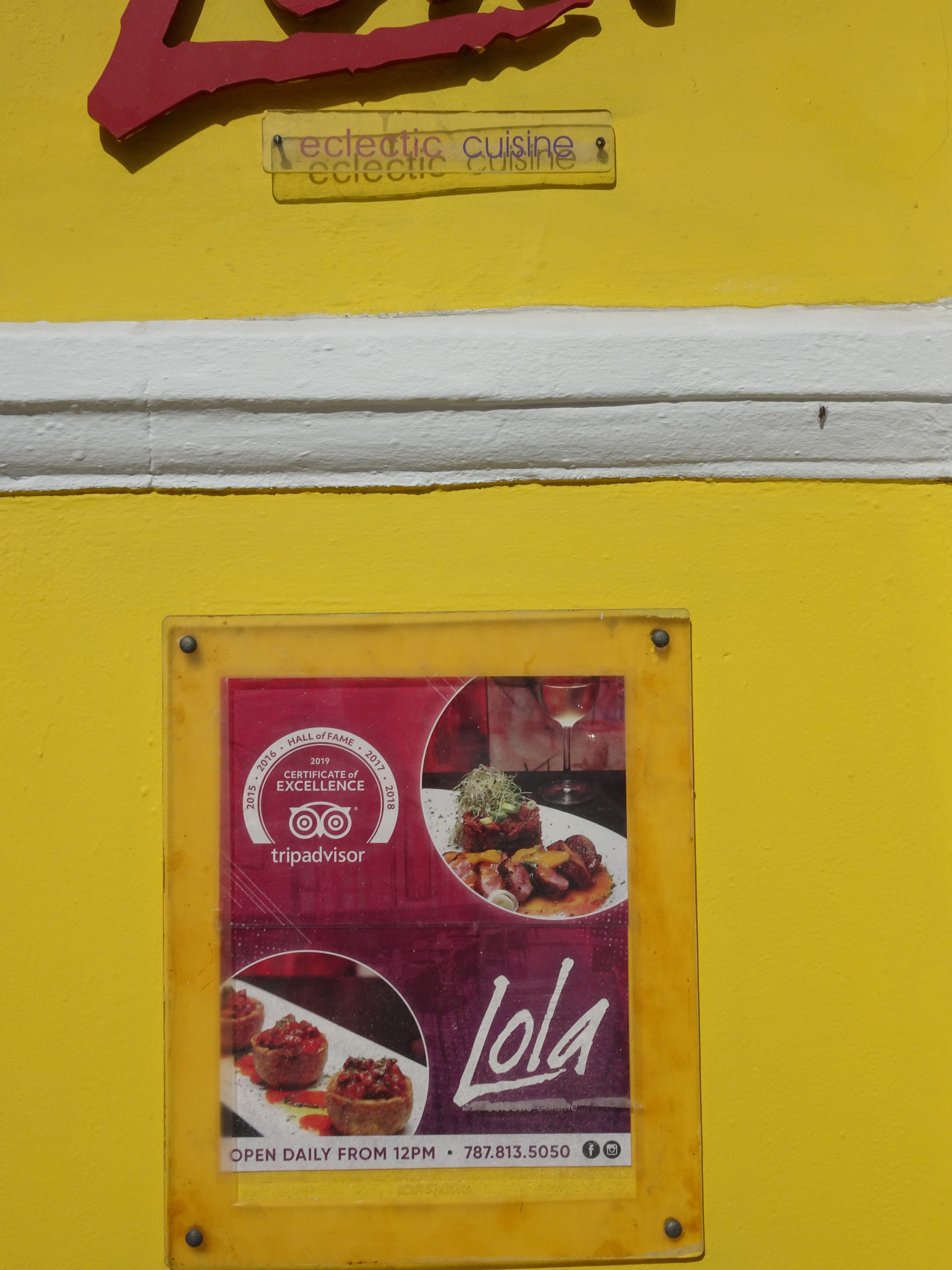
Restaurant signs at the Ponce Plaza Hotel & Casino

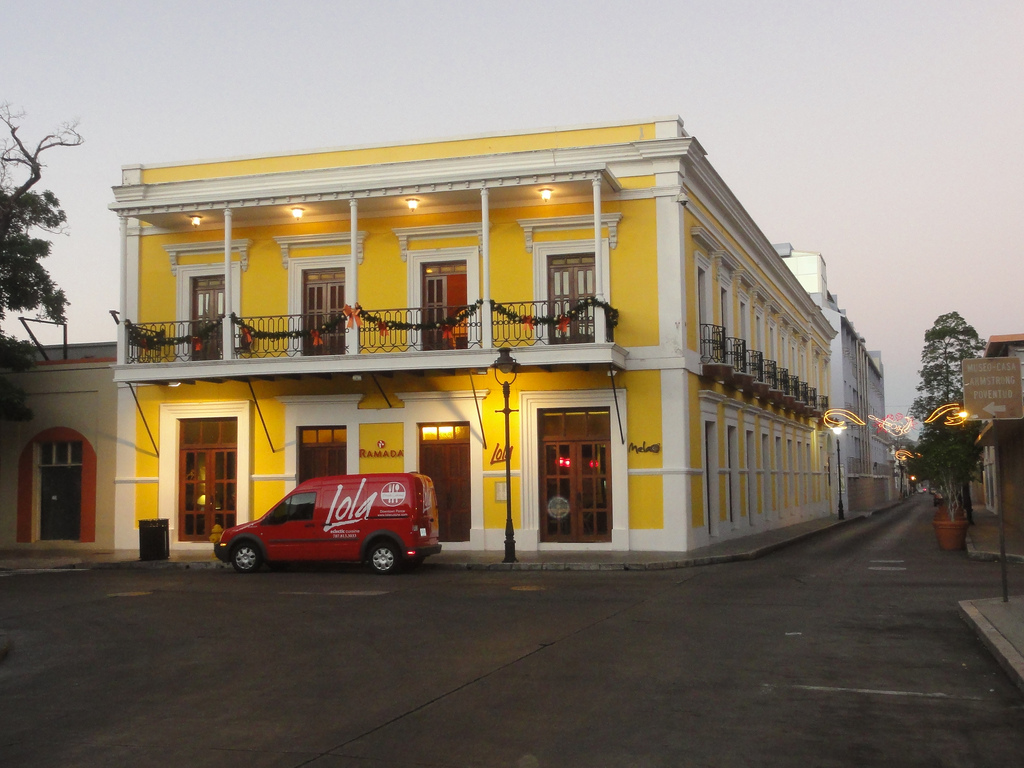
Ponce Plaza Hotel & Casino on Calle Union and Plaza Las Delicias

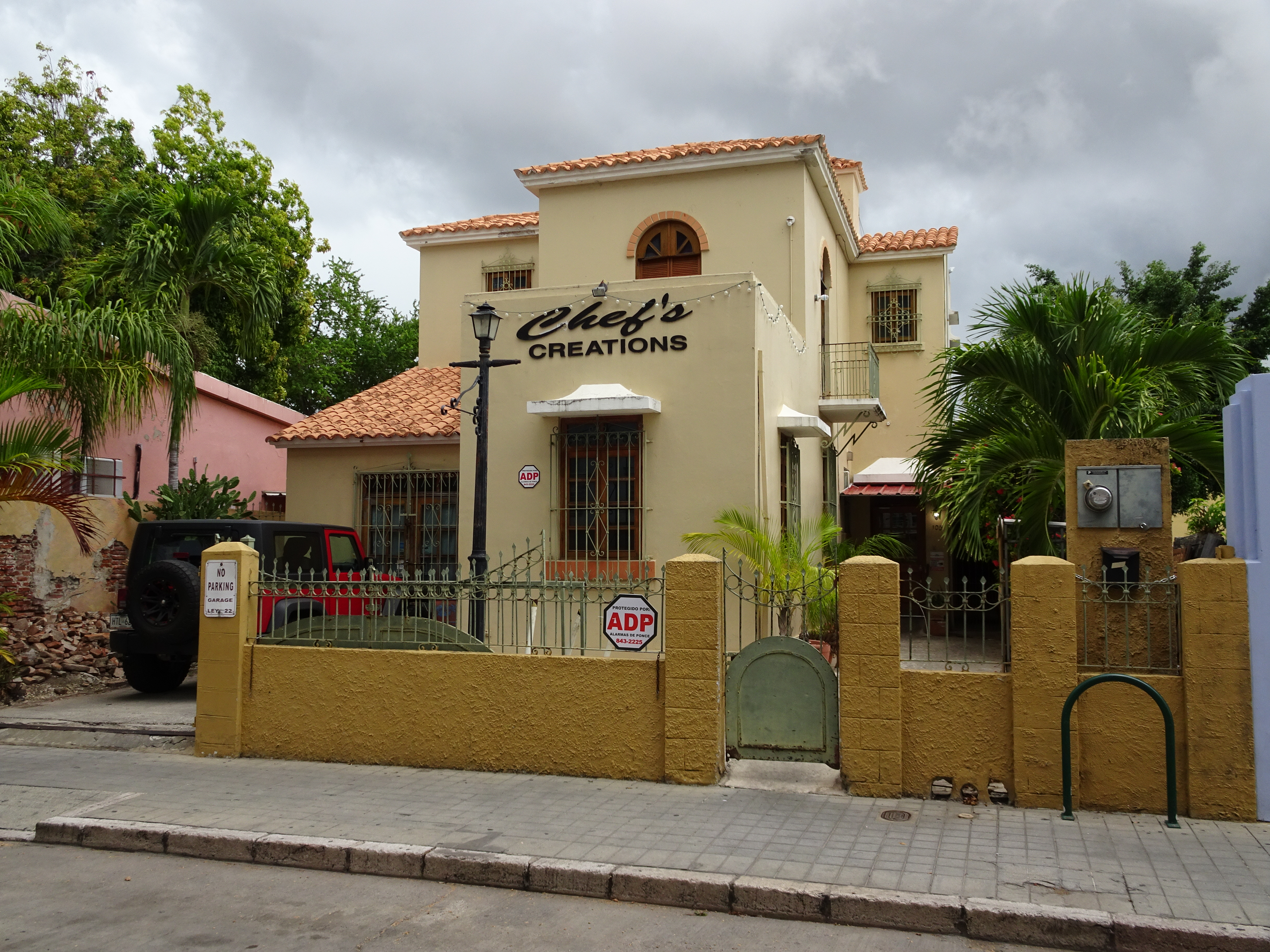
Puerto Rican 'Criollo' food restaurant on Calle Reina near Calle Union

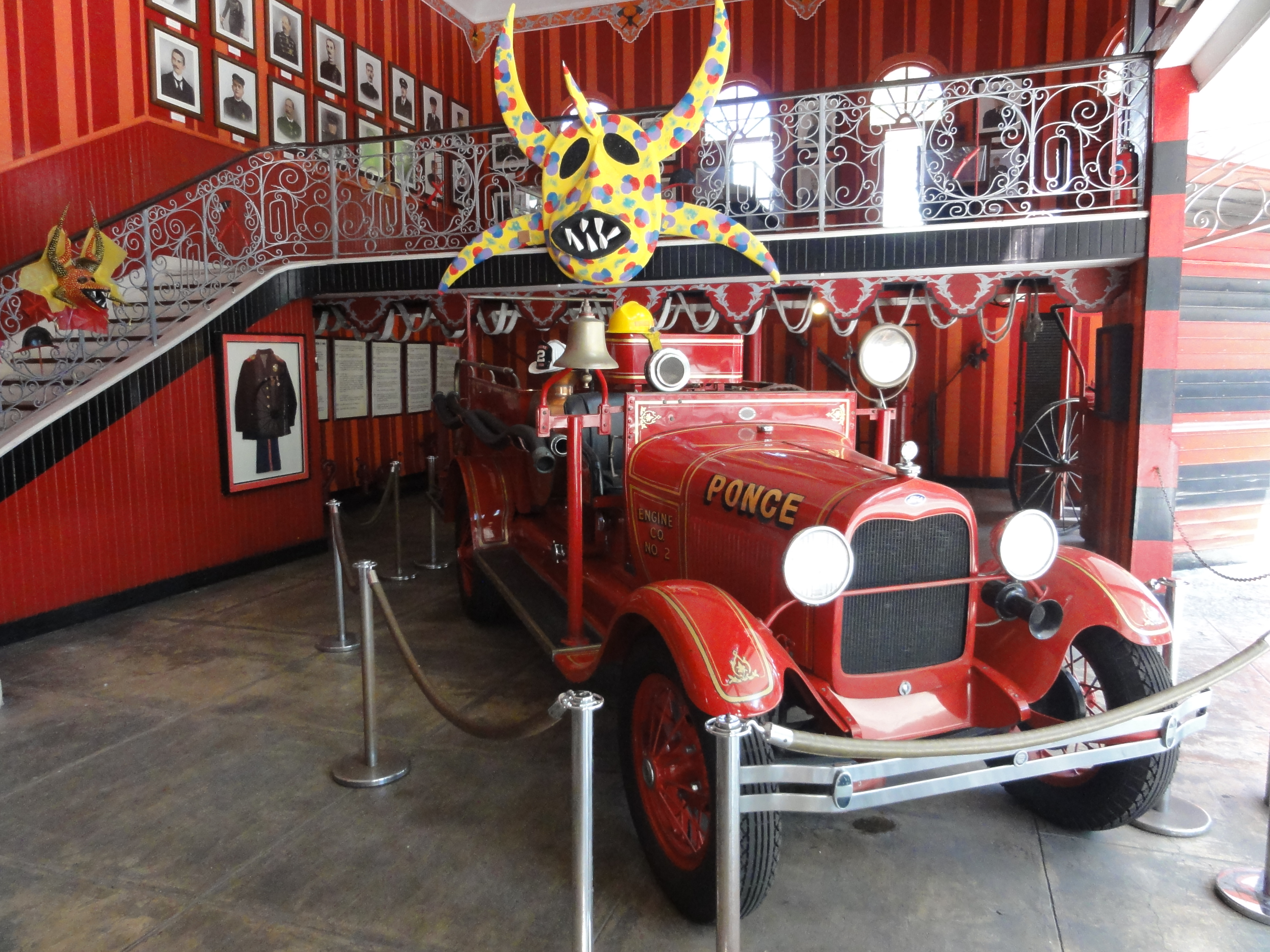
Fire truck at Museo Parque de Bombas at Plaza Las Delicias

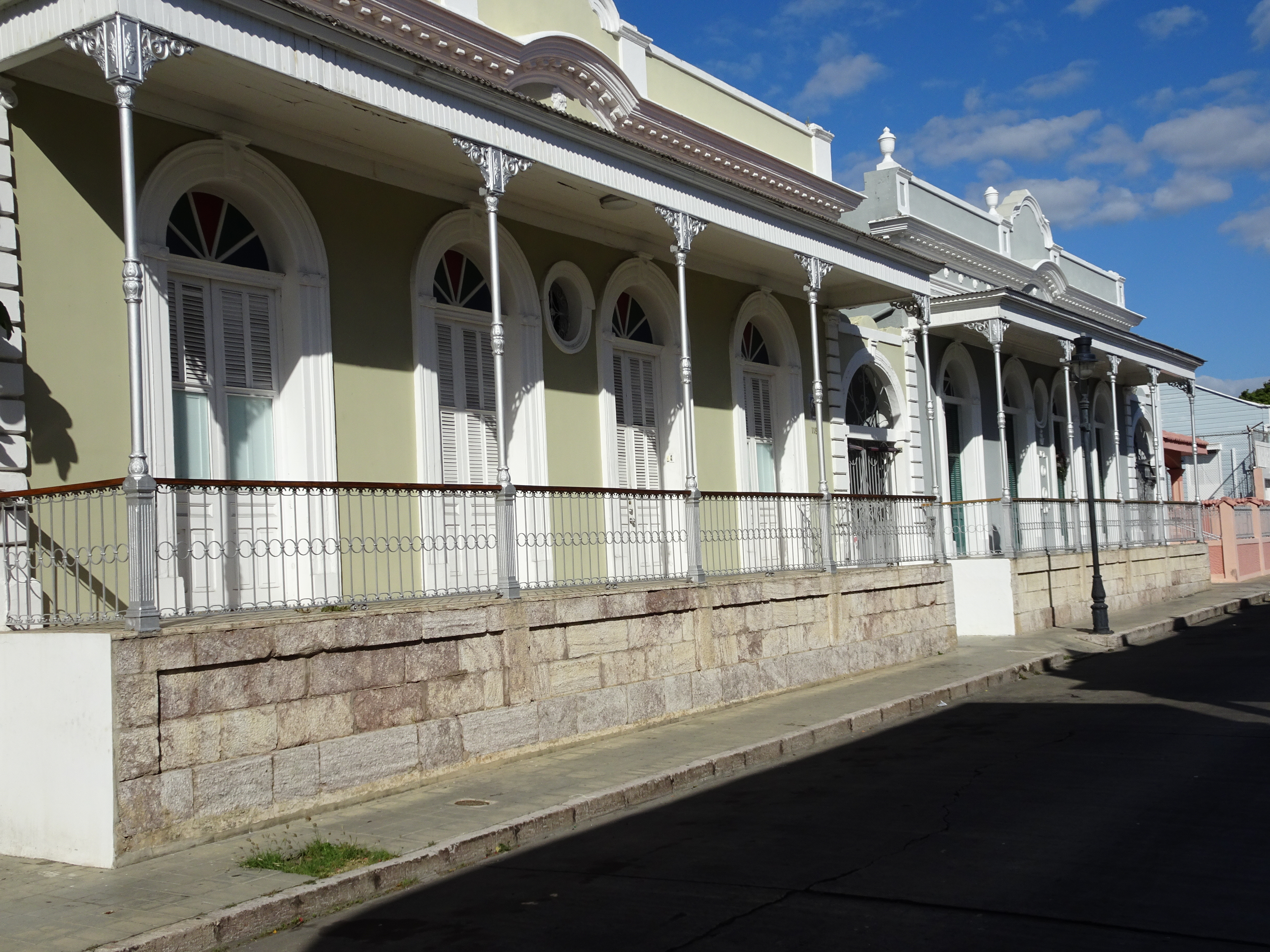
Homes near downtown Ponce on Calle Reina

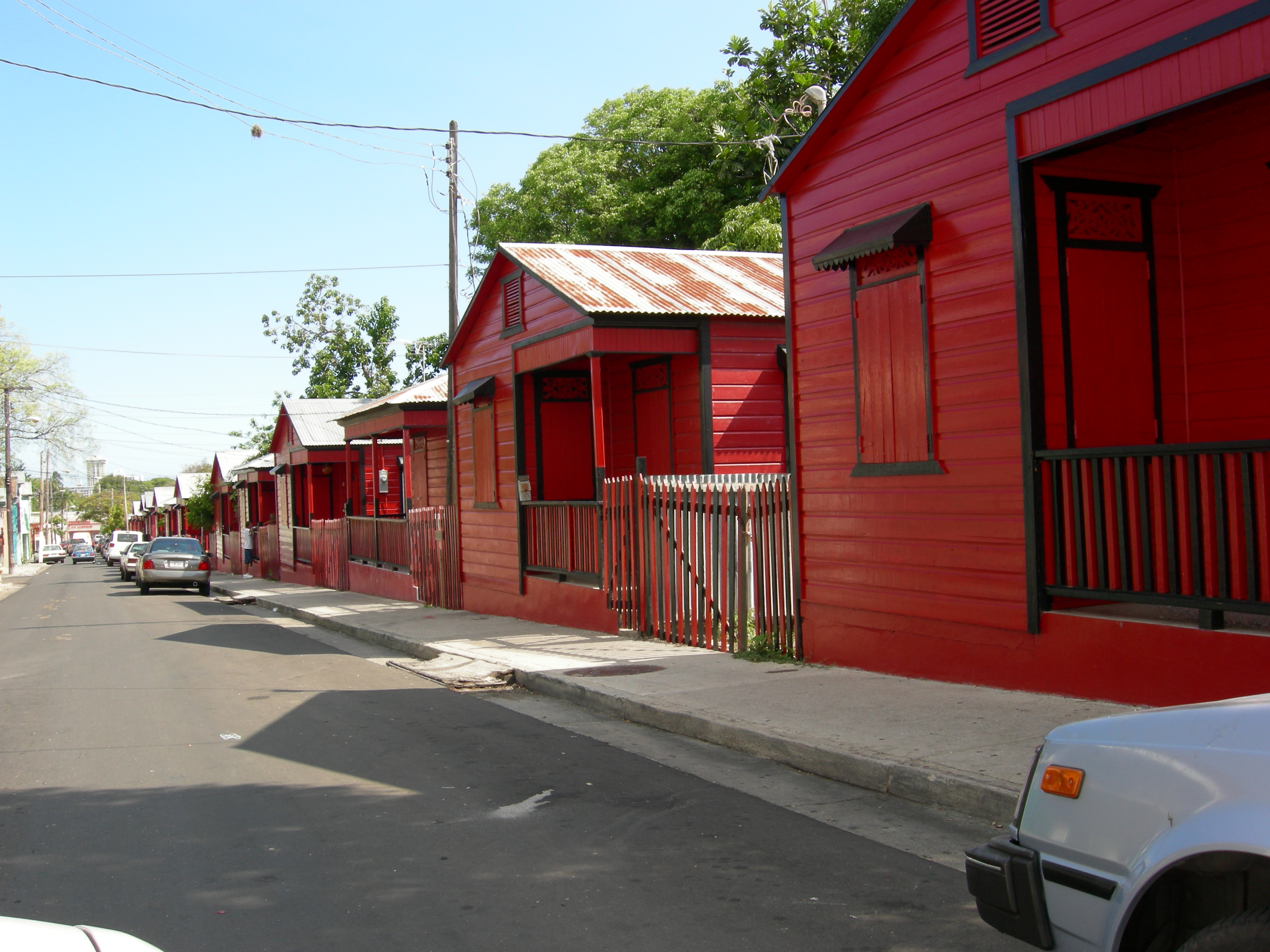
Historic firemen homes on Calle 25 de Enero

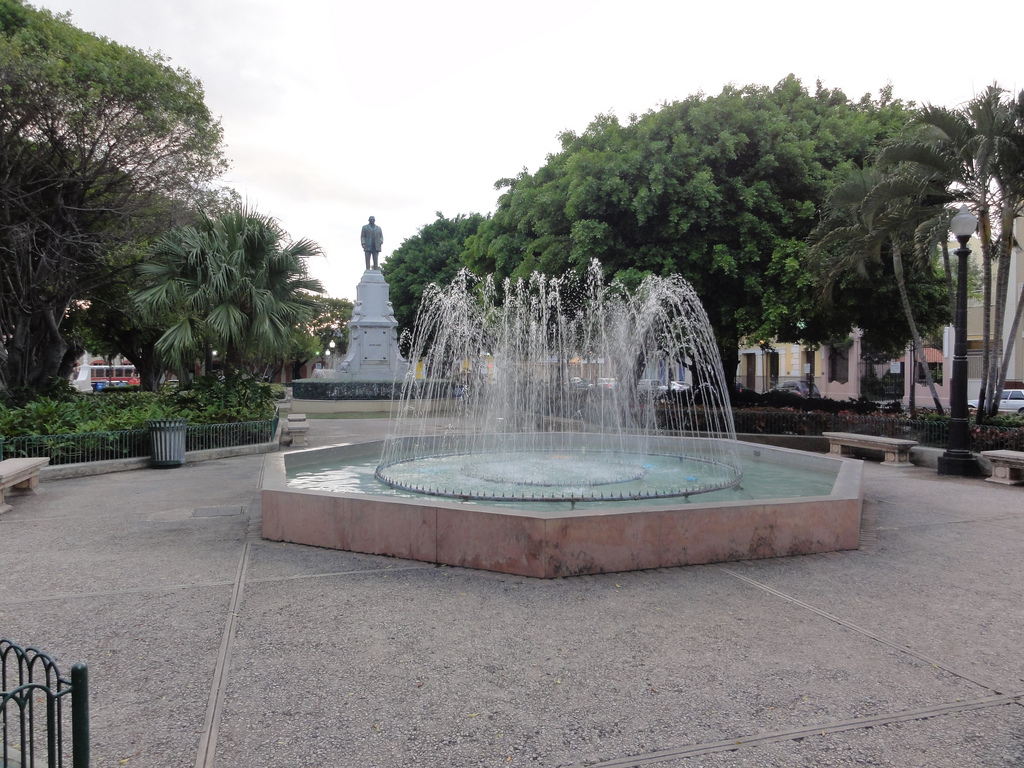
Fountain at Plaza Las Delicias

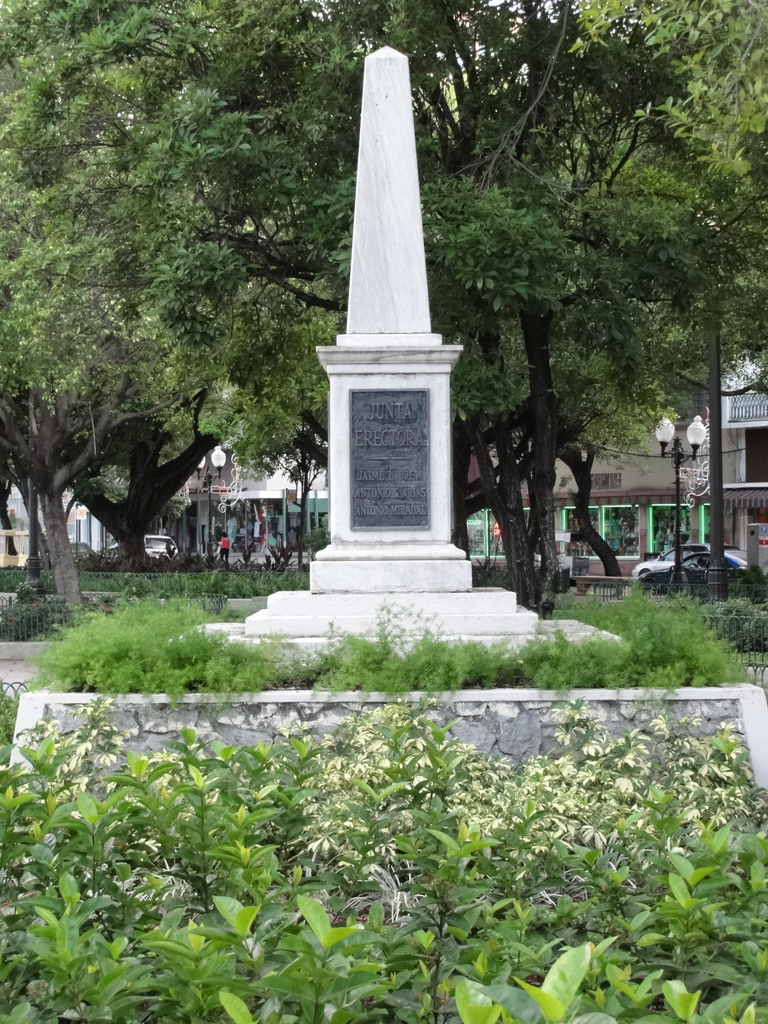
Monument to the 1899 fire heroes at Plaza Las Delicias

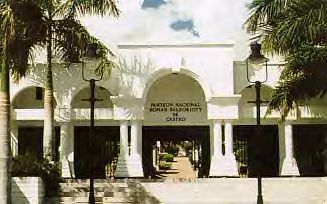
Cemetery museum 6 blocks northwest of downtown Ponce

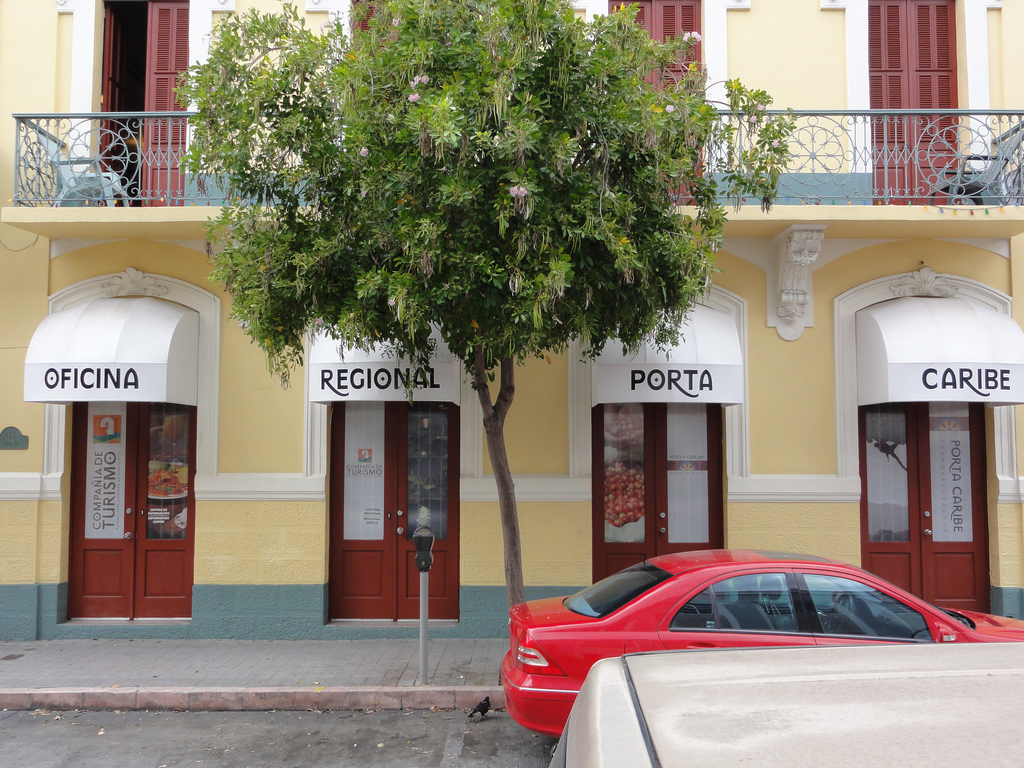
Porta Caribe tourist welcome center on Calle Villa

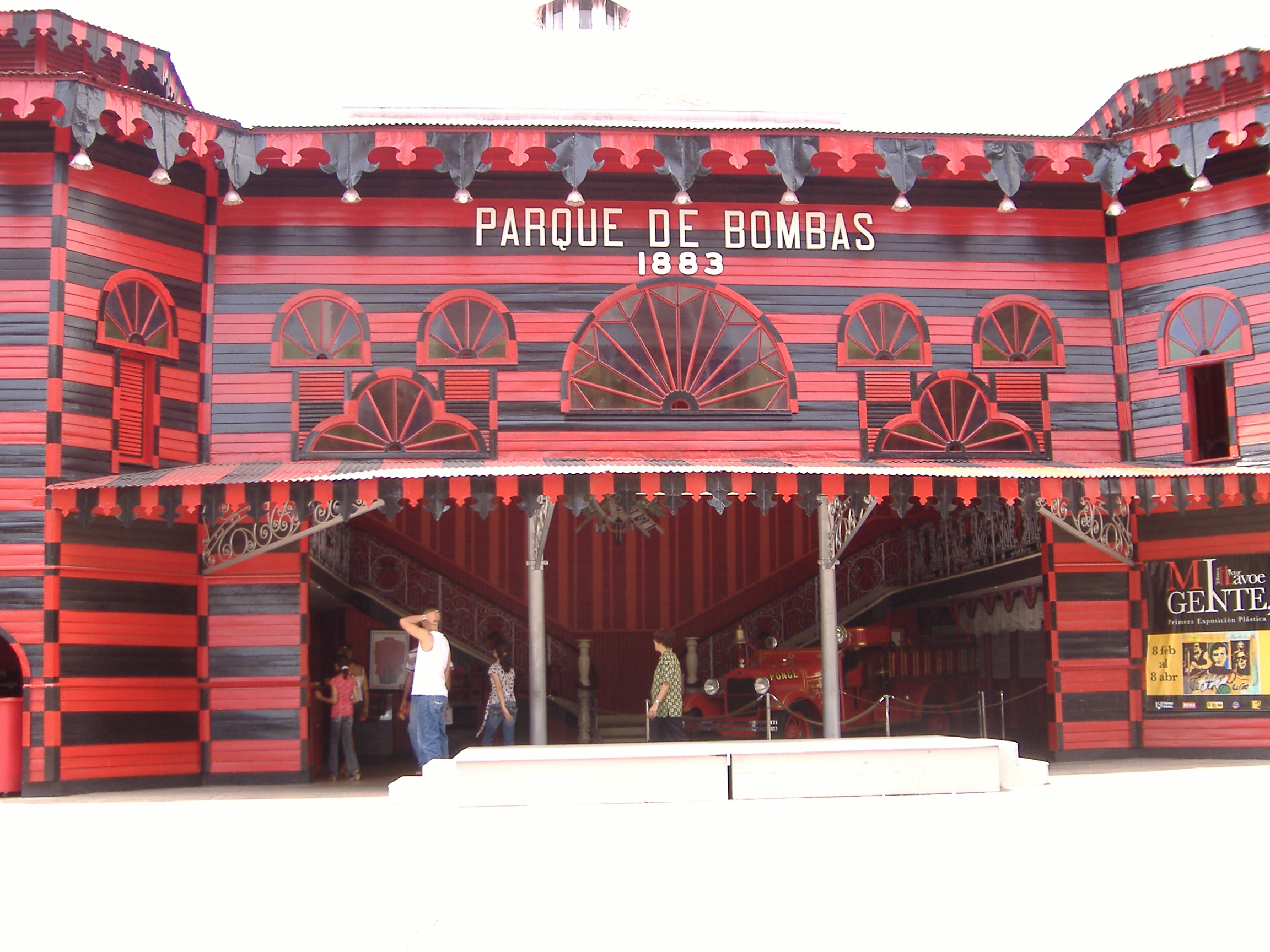
1882 Museo Parque de Bombas at Plaza Las Delicias

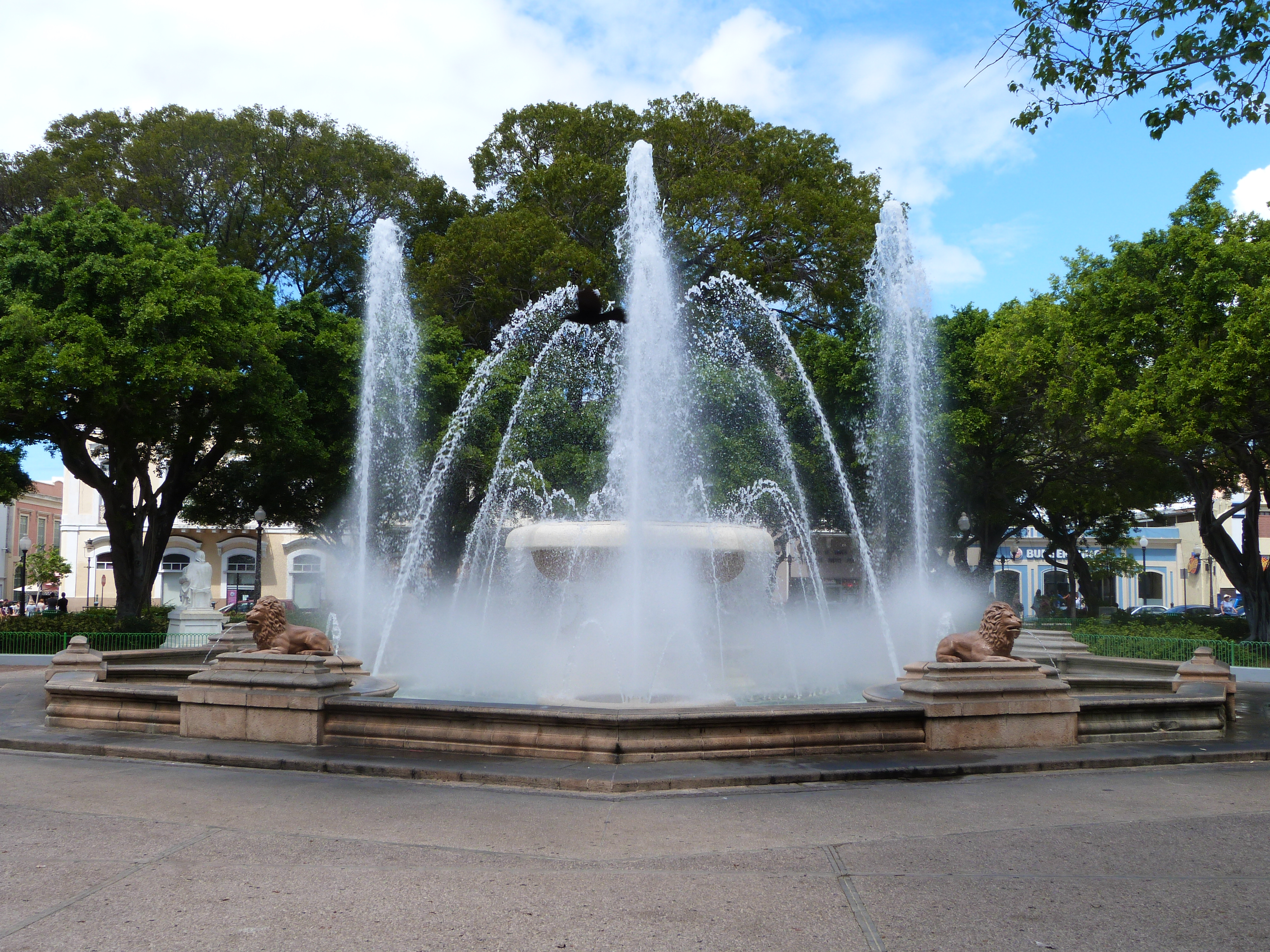
Lions Fountain at Plaza Las Delicias

== See also ==
- List of communities in Puerto Rico
