= Cementerio Católico San Vicente de Paul =

Cemetery in Ponce, Puerto Rico

- Cementerio Catolico San Vicente de Paul (Note: The cemetery's name is presented here without the accent on "Católico" in conformance with the usage in the cemetery's National Register nomination form and announcement of listing.)
- U.S. National Register of Historic Places
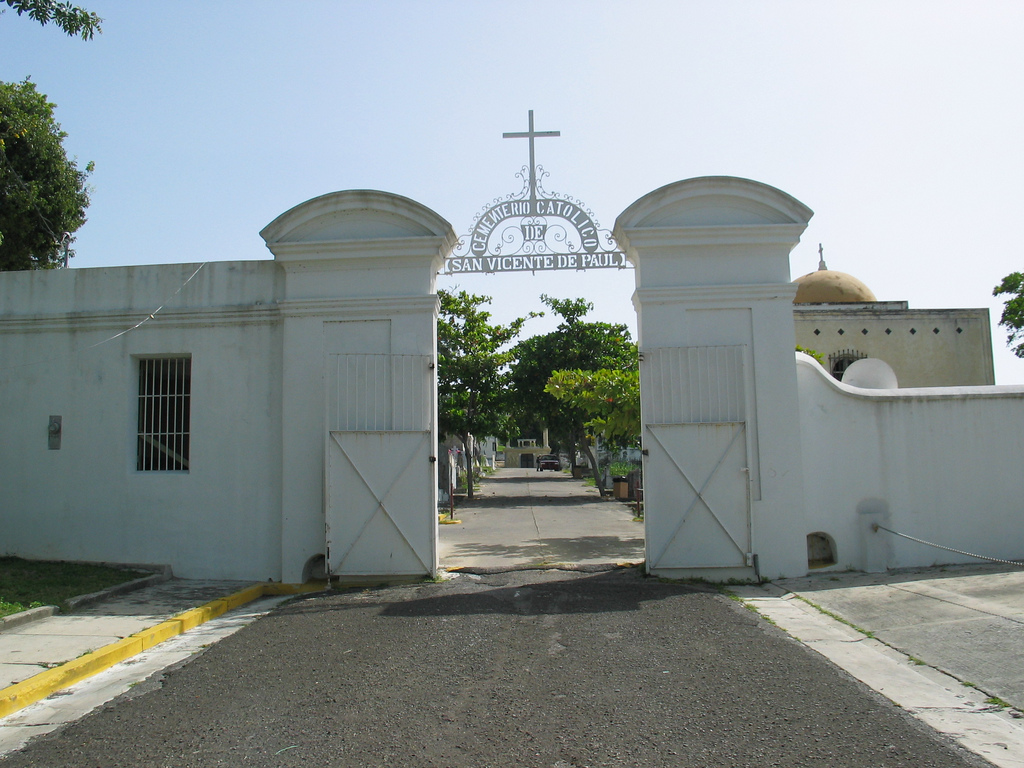
- The cemetery entrance gate in 2010

- Location within Puerto Rico
- Location: Alma Sublime Street; Ponce, Puerto Rico
- Coordinates: 18°01′00″N 66°38′02″W
- Area: 9.2 acres (3.7 ha)
- Built: 1901
- Architectural style: Classical Revival, Spanish Revival, Art Deco
- NRHP reference No.: 88001249
- Added to NRHP: 25 August 1988

The Cementerio Católico San Vicente de Paul (English: Saint Vincent de Paul Catholic Cemetery) is a cemetery in the city of Ponce, Puerto Rico. It is the only cemetery in Puerto Rico with a group of niches built forming a basement, in which the burials occurred beneath ground level, thus giving the effect of a catacomb. The cemetery is named after Vincent de Paul (24 April 1581 – 27 September 1660), the French Roman Catholic priest who dedicated his life to serving the poor. It was listed on the U.S. National Register of Historic Places in 1988.

== Location ==
Cementerio Catolico San Vicente de Paul is located off Puerto Rico Route PR-123 in barrio Magueyes Urbano. PR-123 used to be signed PR-10, and this last route numbering might still be seen in some older documents about this cemetery. The cemetery is located on a site with a steep terrain gradient.

== History ==
During the turn of the 20th century the priests of San Vicente de Paul built a private Catholic cemetery in Ponce. The site was blessed on 15 August 1901 and opened to the public. The wealthy families of the area bought plots for $60 and began to develop the cemetery with magnificent graves and mausoleums. Today (February 2016), the cemetery is "squeezed" between sprawling urban residential developments that now fully surround it.

== Background and significance ==
Ponce, located in the south coast of Puerto Rico, was one of the wealthiest settlements of the island at the turn of the 20th century. Given the status of area cemeteries at the time, the Catholic cemetery offered an exclusive precinct in which the rich could bury their dead. For this reason almost all the tombs are magnificent in their design, ornamentation, and construction. Some of the best examples of funerary architecture in Puerto Rico of the early 20th century period can be seen in this cemetery. Marble sculptures from Italy, Spain and other parts of Europe adorn many of the tombs. Most tombs are covered with Ponce's ubiquitous stylish pink marble as well.

The larger mausolea, which belong to the wealthiest families of southern Puerto Rico, are magnificent examples of monumental funerary architecture of the period. Some of the best examples are the mausoleums of the Serralles, Mercado, Toro, and Valdivieso families.

The cemetery is unique among others in Puerto Rico: "A unique feature of the cemetery is a group of niches that were built forming a basement, in which the burials occurred beneath ground level, thus giving the effect of a catacomb".

== Design ==
The cemetery has a simple entrance gate. It consists of an iron gate flanked by two masonry pilasters. Although Catholic, this cemetery never had a chapel by the entrance, or anywhere in the entire precinct.

The layout of the cemetery was done following the Spanish tradition of having two main axes forming a cross. The rest of the precinct's layout was done in a square grid fashion. The cemetery follows the contour lines of the steep site it is located on. As a results, some of the approach paths were built as stairs.

The main axis culminates with the pantheon for the priests of the Paul order. "In this truly monumental tomb, sculptural forms are integral part of architecture. An interesting feature in this design with double function is the baldachino, which protects not only the altar, but also the tomb. The baroque style of this structure can be appreciated in the free use of forms, its large scale and sweeping vistas, and the complexity of its composition."

The cemetery has a clear arrangement of larger tombs placed along the major central and secondary axes. The other graves then radiate from there. Many of these larger tombs are mausoleums in different architectural styles ranging from the classical revival to the art-deco.

== Architecture ==
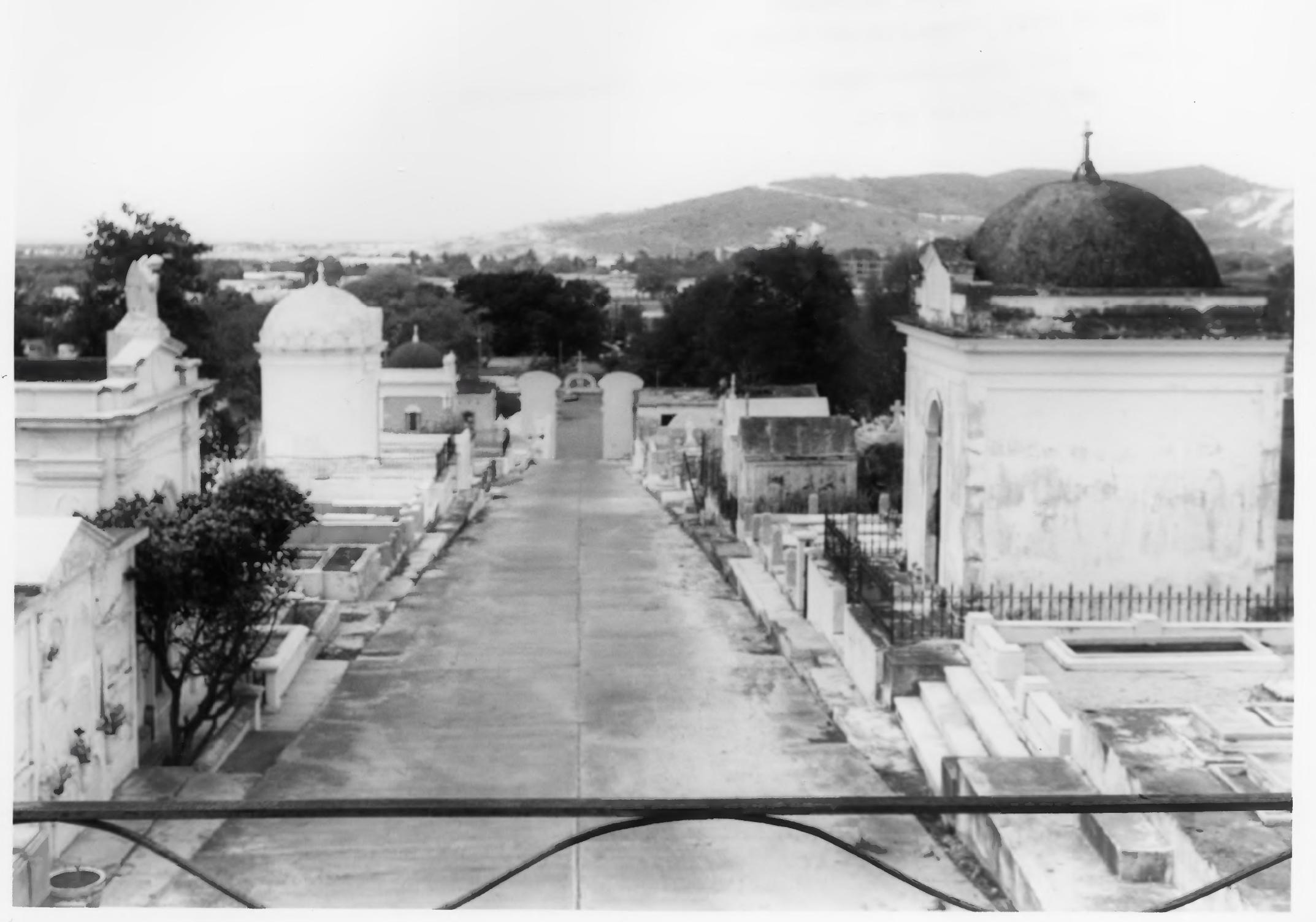
Cementerio Catolico San Vicente de Paul in March 1988

The style of the cemetery is characterized more by its architectural than by its sculptural features. The quality of the construction is such that "it is considered the posthumous mansion" of those buried there. A considerable number of the mausoleum in this cemetery are made of marble, a testimony to the wealth of those interred there.

Of special significance for their architectural value are the Serralles family mausoleum composed of a central chapel raised over a raised plaza, the Mario Mercado Montalvo family mausoleum also over a raised plaza, and the Valdivieso family mausoleum. The Toro family mausoleum also presents a funerary chapel but it is not raised over a plaza nor is the Chardon family mausoleum.

== Recent developments ==
Many of these magnificent tombs have been abandoned after their owners moved corpses of their dead to the Cementerio Civil de Ponce. This was due in part to the high cost of maintenance and the strict regulations set by the administration. Under no condition would they allow a non-Catholic to be buried there. Some families did not want to be separated by this rule and moved their loved ones to the Cementerio Civil. As a result, some graves have been abandoned and cannot be sold by the cemetery administration since they are private property and have a legal, albeit uninterested, owner.
