= Gladys Esther Tormes González =

Puerto Rican historian

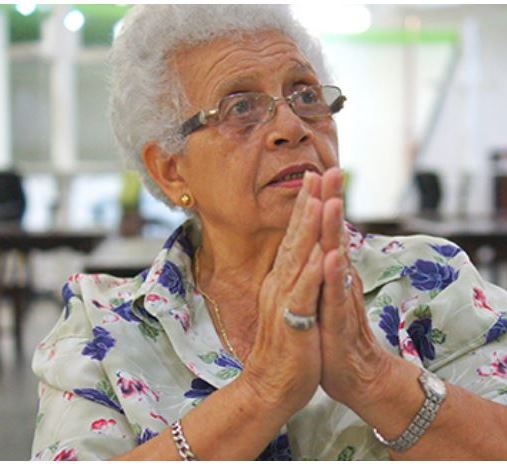
- Gladys Tormes González in 2015
- Born: 19 September 1933; Ponce, Puerto Rico
- Occupations: Head archivist and historian

Gladys Esther Tormes González (born 19 September 1933) (a.k.a. “Maja”) is a historian and head archivist of the Archivo Histórico de Ponce (English: Ponce Historical Archive), in Ponce, Puerto Rico. Serving since 1974, she is the longest-serving archivist in the municipality of Ponce.

== Early years and schooling ==
Tormes González was born in Ponce, Puerto Rico, on 19 September 1933. She is the daughter of Leopoldo Tormes García, who was a member of the Puerto Rico House of Representatives for 20 years.

She attended the Román Baldorioty de Castro and Dr. Rafael Pujáls elementary schools in Ponce, and the McKinley middle school also in Ponce. She then attended the Academia Bautista de Barranquitas in Barranquitas, Puerto Rico. She then moved to Ohio where she graduated from Bluffton College. She moved to Salamanca, Spain where she studied at the Universidad de Salamanca and subsequently moved to Seville, Spain where she graduated with a degree of Licenciada en Derecho.

== Public service ==
In 1970 she became assistant to Ponce Mayor Juan H. Cintrón working in the Nixon Plan. It was during this time that she became interested in the history of Ponce, “because people came asking about it”, she later recollected.

On 15 April 1974, during the administration of Mayor Luis A. “Wito” Morales, she is named Archivera General del Municipio de Ponce (English: Head Archivist of the Municipality of Ponce). She filled the vacancies left by document administrators Leopoldo Ruiz y Acasio Torres.

In 1975, Tormes González was instrumental in identifying a new headquarters to consolidate all the documents of related to the history of Ponce. Under her guidance, the Archivo Histórico de Ponce was first headquartered on the second level of Teatro La Perla. It was inaugurated on 19 June 1975, with a budget of only $5,000. She was also instrumental in ensuring that the documents about the history of Ponce were not moved to San Juan when a proposal to annex then to the Puerto Rico Historical Archive in San Juan was gathering support. A 1973 ruled that municipalities without their own facilities to archive their documents were to send such documents to the Archivo General de Puerto Rico (Puerto Rico Archives) in San Juan.

In 2000, Tormes González was the only Puerto Rican invited to participate on a workshop on municipal archives held in Madrid, Spain, in 2000 and sponsored by the municipality of Alcobendas.

She was co-founder of Red de Archivos Históricos de Puerto Rico (English: Puerto Rico Historical Archives Network). Between 1970 and 1989, she also was a coordinator for the Carnaval Ponceño. She has held prominent roles in the Unión de Mujeres Americanas (American Women's Union).

=== Archivo Histórico de Ponce ===
The Archivo Histórico de Ponce comprises all the documentation generated by the agencies of the municipality of Ponce as well as donations by private citizens. It also contains documentation about other municipalities in Puerto Rico. Archivo Histórico has some 100 million archived documents. Among these are letters, maps, brochures, photos, newspaper clippings, full newspaper samples, microfilms, cancelled municipal payroll checks, municipal employee files, books, and other similar documents. These are archived in some 300, 000 files. They are archived under the card catalog system. Other documents kept there are entire registry of slaves, architectural plans, films, sound tracks, and newspapers dating to 1874, as well as city government documents about the founding, history and evolution of Ponce from the 1812 Municipal Assembly until the present.

It operates on a physically and organizationally centralized fashion. The building has some 19,700 square feet of space and distributed over three levels. It is considered “the most complete historical archive in Puerto Rico.” Archivo Histórico has 32 employees. Among its employees are 12 professional archivists.

Archivo Histórico receives over 18,000 visitors every year, including historians, university professors, legislators, and students from Puerto Rico and abroad.

The Archivo has been located in different headquarters through the years. It was originally located at the Ponce City Hall. During the mayoral administration of Luis A. Morales (1973-1976) it was moved to the second floor of Teatro La Perla on 19 June 1975. It subsequently moved to Calle Marina across from Plaza Las Delicias in the facility that for many years held the Felipe Garcia department store. Around 2014 it moved again to the Ponce Servicios building, where it remains today (2018).

== Accolades ==
In 1985, Tormes González was selected as one of the most prominent women in the city of Ponce. Tormes González is also recognized at Ponce's Park of Illustrious Ponce Citizens as one of the distinguished historians of the municipality. In 2017, social scientist and historian Eli D. Oquendo-Rodriguez dedicated to Gladys Esther Tormes González his 249-page documentary on Barrio Playa titled "A Orillas del Mar Caribe: Boceto Histórico de la Playa de Ponce, desde sus Primeros Habitantes hasta Principios del Siglo XX" (Sketch of Playa de Ponce, from its first inhabitants until the early 20th century).

== See also ==
- Ponce, Puerto Rico
- List of Puerto Ricans
