= Juan Luis Boscio =

Puerto Rican politician

Juan Luis Boscio Desprez
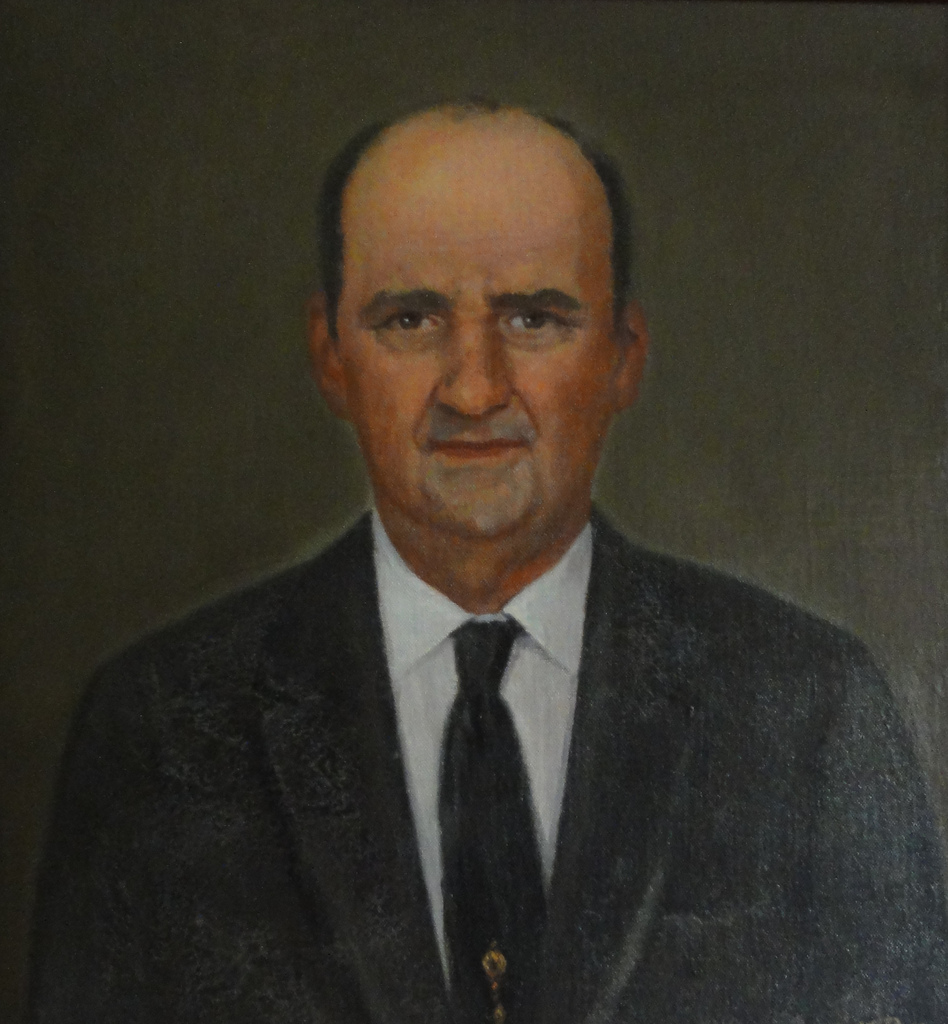
- Juan Luis Boscio, former mayor of Ponce, Puerto Rico
- Preceded by: Carlos Juan Cintrón
- Succeeded by: Eduardo Ruberté Bisó

Member of the Puerto Rico Senate from the Ponce district
- In office 1940–1941

125th Mayor of Ponce, Puerto Rico
- In office 1961–1964

Personal details
- Born: 21 June 1896 Cabo Rojo, Puerto Rico
- Died: 3 September 1980 (aged 84) Ponce, Puerto Rico
- Party: PPD
- Spouse: Herminia Monllor Long
- Children: Roberto, Jose Luis, Gladys
- Profession: Merchant ("Almacenes Monllor y Boscio")

Juan Luis Boscio Desprez (21 June 1896 – 3 September 1980) was a Puerto Rican merchant and Mayor of Ponce, Puerto Rico from 1961 to 1964. During his tenure as mayor, in 1962, a major shopping mall opened in the city called Centro del Sur which, at the moment of its opening was "the most modern in the Caribbean".

== Early years ==
Boscio Desprez was the son of Juan Bautista Boscio-Cofresí and Eugenia Desprez Boudon. He was born on 21 June 1896 in Cabo Rojo, Puerto Rico. He married Herminia Monllor on 23 December 1922 and they had 3 children: Roberto (b. abt. 1925), Jose Luis (b. abt 1926), and Gladys (b. abt. 1928).

== Politics ==
In 1944, he was selected to conclude the term of Senator Ramón Barreto Pérez. He was a member of the Puerto Rico Senate in 1944 and chaired two Senate commissions, the Labor Commission; and the Police and Civil Service Commission. In the 1960 elections, he was elected Mayor of the city of Ponce, a position he held from 1961 to 1964.

== Philanthropist ==
Juan Luis Boscio was one of the founders of the Albergue de Niños de Ponce (Ponce Children's Shelter), a non-profit organization dedicated to the providing shelter for homeless children. The shelter building opened in 1947 on the north side of Calle Villa in Barrio Canas, between Calle Cementerio Civil and Calle Central. Boscio also donated $10,000 from his own capital to help pay for the project. Albergue de Niños later moved to the south side of Calle Villa, past Jaime L. Drew School, east of PR-500.

== Death ==
Boscio Deprez died on 3 September 1980 from an "aortic insufficiency and heart failure." He was buried at Cementerio Católico San Vicente de Paul in Ponce.

== Indictment of son ==
In the early 1980s, Juan Luis Boscio Monllor, son of Juan Luis Boscio Desprez, (aka, Juan Luis Boscio, Jr.) was president of the board of directors of the Ponce Municipal Development Authority (PMDA) during the tenure of mayor José G. Tormos Vega. His son, Boscio Monllor, was indicted on 31 October 1985, by a federal grand jury for extortion, together with mayor Tormos Vega. He was tried on 27 May 1988.

== See also ==
- Ponce, Puerto Rico
- List of Puerto Ricans

Political offices
Preceded by Carlos Juan Cintrón	Mayor of Ponce, Puerto Rico; 1961–1964	Succeeded by Eduardo Ruberté Bisó
