= List of libraries in Ponce, Puerto Rico =

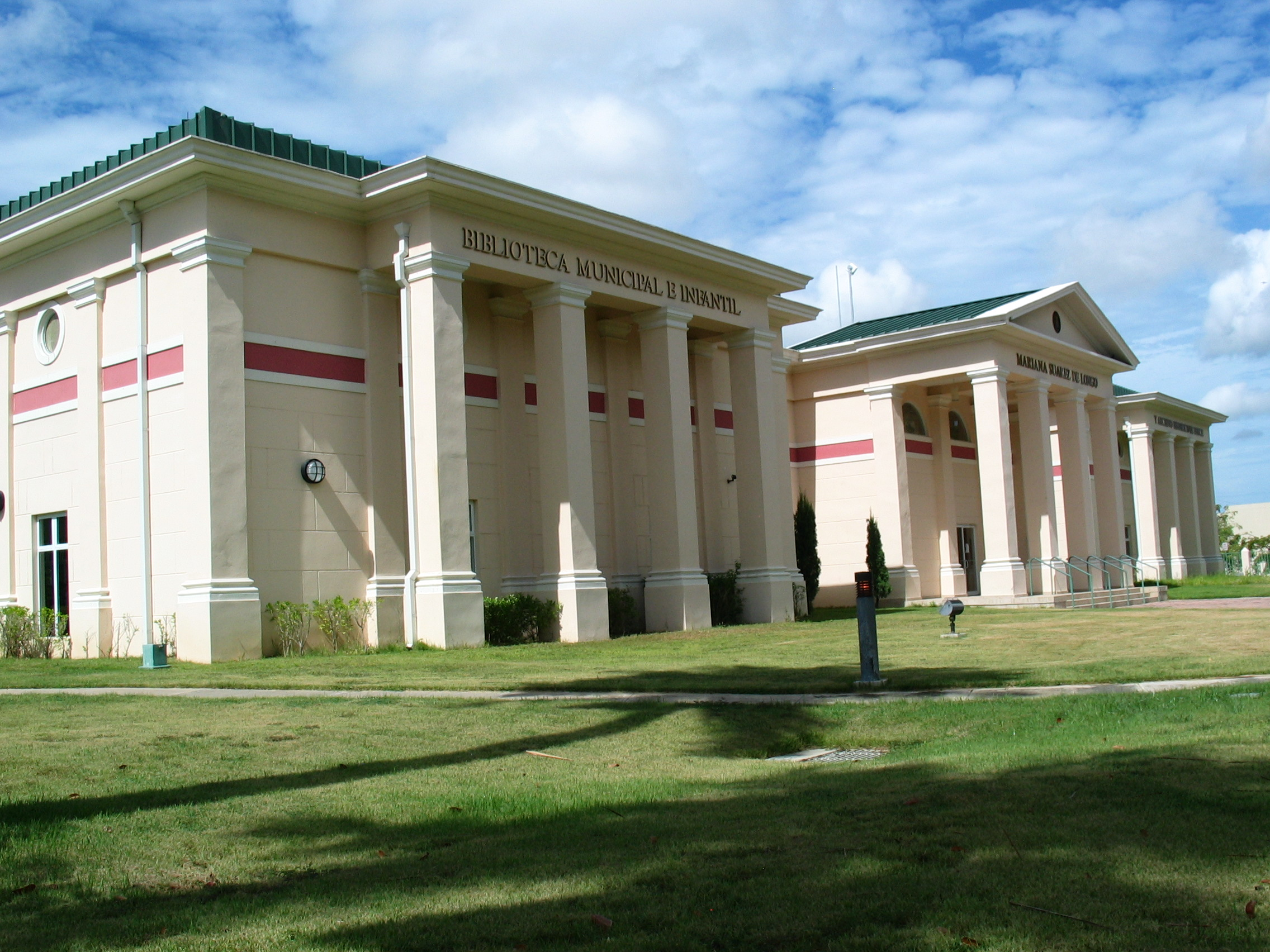
Biblioteca Municipal de Ponce, main location on Bulevar Miguel Pou

This is a list of libraries in Ponce, Puerto Rico. Both, public and private libraries are listed. Also listed, for their environment conductive to study and research, are non-circulating, archive organizations.

== Library list summary table ==
Note: The table that follows lists libraries by their year of founding, that is, their year of opening. A listing sorted by any of the other fields can be obtained by clicking on the header of the field. For example, clicking on "Barrio" will sort libraries by their barrio location.

No.	Name	Photo	Barrio	Location	Type/Use	Year Library Opened	Year Current Structure Built	Building Architect	Owner / Host	Architectural style
1	Archivo Histórico de Ponce		Quinto	C. Mayor SB, and C. Estrella EB	Historical archives	1812	2007	Octavio Rodríguez Jr.	Ponce Municipal Government	Brutalist
2	Biblioteca Municipal de Ponce		San Antón	Bulevar Miguel Pou EB	Public library	1870	2007	Unk	Ponce Municipal Government	Modern
3	Biblioteca Encarnación Valdés		Canas Urbano	PUCPR; Avenida Las Américas EB	University library	1948	1969	Unk	Universidad Católica de Puerto Rico	Modern
4	Centro de Acceso a la Información		Sabanetas	UIA-Ponce; PR-1 WB	University library	1962	1984	Unk	Universidad Interamericana de Puerto Rico en Ponce	Modern
5	Biblioteca Adelina Coppin Alvarado		Playa	PR-2 EB at PR-12	University library	1970	1970	Unk	Universidad de Puerto Rico en Ponce	Modern
6	Biblioteca Fundación Rafael Hernández Colón		Quinto	C. Mayor NB and C. Castillo EB	Political history library	1992	2015	Manuel V. Domenech	Fundación Biblioteca Rafael Hernández Colón	Neoclassical

Key:
C. = Calle (street)
NB = Northbound
SB = Southbound
WB = Westbound
EB = Eastbound
Unk = Unknown
N/A = Not applicable

== See also ==
- List of libraries in the United States
