= José Dapena Laguna =

Puerto Rican politician

Member of the Puerto Rico Senate from the Ponce district
- In office 1960–1968

123rd Mayor of Ponce, Puerto Rico
- In office 9 November 1956 – 1 January 1957
- Preceded by: Andrés Grillasca Salas
- Succeeded by: Carlos Juan Cintrón

Personal details
- Born: 28 July 1912 Ponce, Puerto Rico
- Died: 20 September 1991 (aged 79) Ponce, Puerto Rico
- Party: Popular Democratic Party of Puerto Rico (PDP)
- Spouse: Georgina Thompson
- Children: Jose, Maria Rosa, Georgia, Victoria Eugenia (called Baby)
- Education: University of Puerto Rico School of Law (JD)
- Profession: Attorney

José Nazario Dapena Laguna (28 July 1912 – 20 September 1991) was a Puerto Rican attorney and Mayor of Ponce, Puerto Rico, in 1956.

== Early years ==
José Dapena Laguna was born in Ponce on 28 July 1912. His parents were Ramon Dapena Pacheco and Maria Laguna y Cedo. He was the father of José Dapena Thompson, mayor of Ponce from 1984 to 1988.

== Political life ==
In 1941, he worked as a political aide in the Ponce City Hall and was also interim municipal secretary. In 1956, he was appointed mayor of Ponce. Later that year (1956) he resigned as mayor to become a member of the House of Representatives of Puerto Rico, a post for which he had been elected. In 1960 he was elected to the Puerto Rico Senate, a post he occupied until 1968.

== Schooling ==
He earned a degree from the University of Puerto Rico School of Law.

== Family life ==
His wife was Georgina Thompson. His children were José (the mayor), Maria Rosa (who became the executive assistant of the first lady of Puerto Rico, Lila Mayoral de Hernandez Colon), Georgianne, and Victoria Eugenia (Baby).

== Last years and legacy ==
Dapena Laguna led a relatively quiet life the last few years of his life. He died in Ponce on 20 September 1991, of a heart condition. The government of Ponce honored him by naming the main Ponce firehouse after him.

== See also ==
- Ponce, Puerto Rico
- List of Puerto Ricans

Political offices
Preceded by Andrés Grillasca Salas	Mayor of Ponce, Puerto Rico; 9 November 1956 - 1 January 1957	Succeeded by Carlos Juan Cintrón
