= Fundación Biblioteca Rafael Hernández Colón =

Library and museum

- Fundación Biblioteca Rafael Hernández Colón
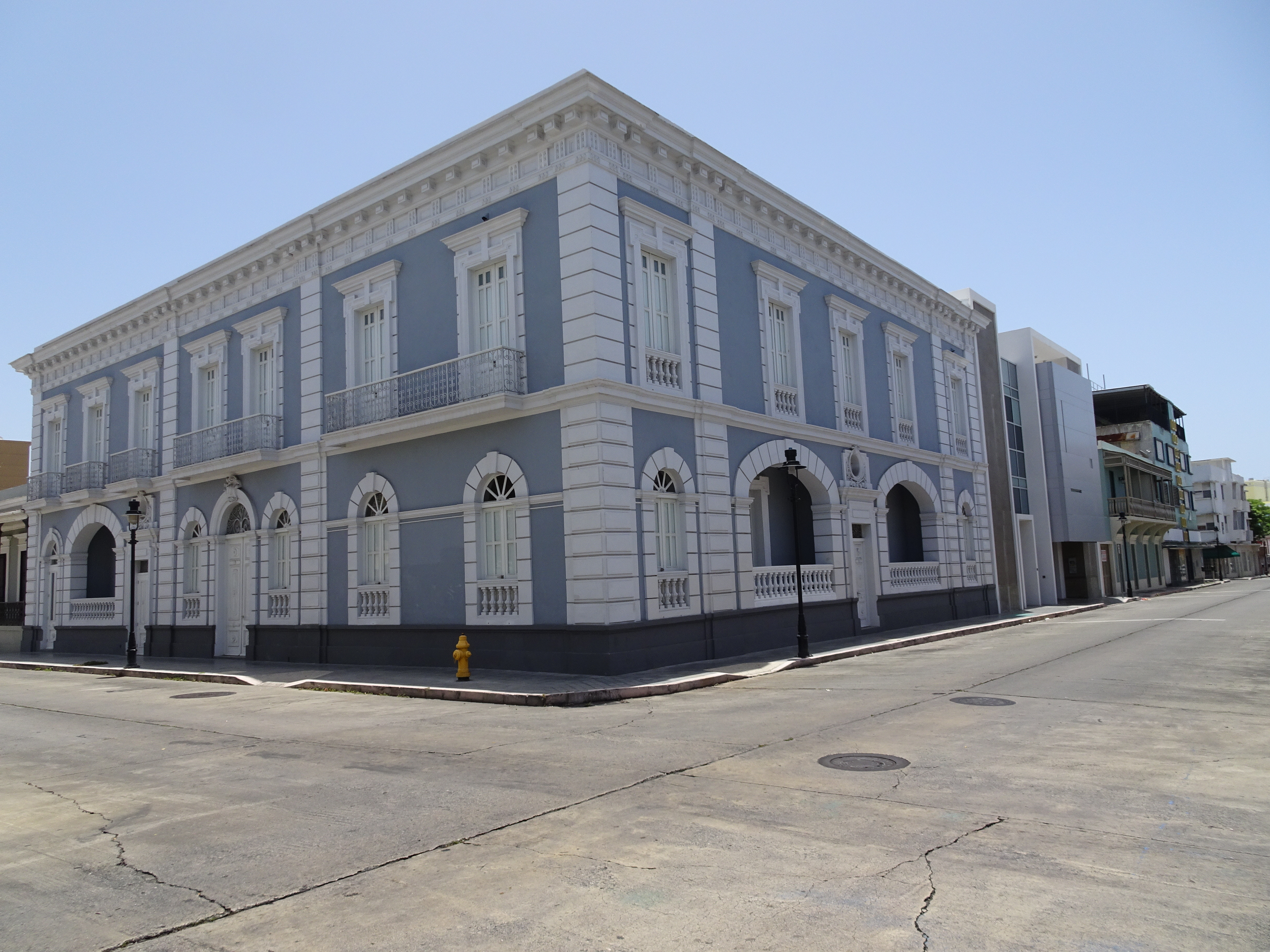
- Headquarters of Fundación Biblioteca Rafael Hernández Colón in Barrio Quinto, Ponce, Puerto Rico
- 18°0′51.0474″N 66°36′43.452″W
- Location: Calle Mayor at Calle Castillo (SE corner), Barrio Quinto, Ponce, Puerto Rico
- Type: Gubernatorial library
- Scope: Administration of Gov. Rafael Hernández Colón
- Established: 1992
- Branches: Six Major areas: Interim Director, Lcda. Dora M. Hernândez Mayoral; RHC Gubernatorial Archives: Gerardo Berrios, director; Museum; Gerardo Berrios, director; Puerto Rico Constitutional Hall; Center for Voices of Oral History; Escuela Taller, Eddie Torres, Manager; Lila Mayoral Wirshing Children's Library; Marcia Severino, coordinator

Collection
- Items collected: Photographs, speeches, letters, documents, audios, videos, memorabilia, others
- Size: 4 million documents

Access and use
- Population served: 3 Million

Other information
- Director: Lcdo. José Hernández Mayoral, Chairman of the Board
- Website: rafaelhernandezcolon.org
- References: Informe Anual 2022, Fundación Biblioteca RHC.

Fundación Biblioteca Rafael Hernández Colón (English: Rafael Hernández Colón Foundation Library) is a gubernatorial library and museum that records the political life of three-term governor of Puerto Rico, Rafael Hernández Colón. It was founded in 1992 and in September 2015 it moved to its current location at the southeast corner of Calle Mayor and Calle Castillo in Ponce, Puerto Rico, in the Ponce Historic Zone.

== History ==
Fundación Biblioteca Rafael Hernández Colón is located on two historic buildings, both adjacent to each other, both facing west on Calle Mayor. The construction of Fundación Biblioteca Rafael Hernández Colón at this two sites preserved as much as possible the history of both structures.

The corner lot was first owned by Juan de Dios Conde, a two-time mayor of Ponce in 1836 and 1839. Some 30 years later, in 1872, a new two-story structure was built which became, three years later, Hospital Militar Español de Ponce. In 1896, Gaspar Bonnín y Miró, a businessman from Mallorca, Spain, bought the property, as the Hospital moved to a new and more spacious building elsewhere in the city. In 1898 the structure was taken over by the US Army, upon its invasion of Puerto Rico in July of that year. Eventually the property was acquired by the government of Puerto Rico, and a new building was erected at this corner lot to serve as the site of the Puerto Rico Criminal Courthouse for the District of Ponce. The structure for the Ponce District Courthouse, and still standing, was designed by Manuel Víctor Domenech, an architect from Isabela, Puerto Rico, in the neoclassical style. The building has been home to universities (Interamerican University of Puerto Rico at Ponce was located here for many years) as well as serving as a residential and commercial rental site. This building was built in 1897 in the Neoclassical style, and served as the Ponce Criminal Court, District Court for the Puerto Rico Court System, Centro Español de Ponce headquarters, and as the Ponce campus of the Universidad Interamericana de Puerto Rico as well as for Caribbean University. (Note: For a photo (circa 2002) of Caribbean University at the corner lot of where Fundación Biblioteca Rafael Hernández Colón is currently located, see Neysa Rodriguiez Deynes, Brevario Sobre la Historia de Ponce, Gobierno Municipal Autonomo de Ponce, Oficina de Cultura y Turismo, 2002, p. 135.)

Meanwhile the lot on the second property, the one on the southernmost lot, had only the skeleton of what it once was. The contemporary adaptation of the building was designed by Atelier 66 by architects Magda Bardina, Ligia Saldaña and Roberto Pio Garcia. Much of this building was built from scratch, to provide all the modern services needed by a library-museum, including the electrical room, elevator, offices, rest rooms, and all other support facilities required so that the older historic building to its north would be impacted the least. Perhaps most importantly, a seamless transition from this mostly-rebuilt building to the historic building to the north was achieved via halls that make possible the passage from one building to the other. This building was built in 2014 in the modern style.

== Contents ==
Fundación Biblioteca Rafael Hernández Colón contains over 4 million documents in its historical archives. In addition to its historical archives, the facilities also include an amphitheater, a Sala de la Historia Constitucional (constitutional history hall), a children's library and a museum. The archives include documents such as Hernandez Colon's speech given upon the death of Ponce mayor Rafael Cordero Santiago. It also contains details of Museo del Autonomismo Puertorriqueño, a small museum located in Barrio Segundo that showcases the political history of Puerto Rico with an emphasis on the contributions made by the municipality of Ponce and its residents.

== Other uses ==
In 2002, Fundación Biblioteca was used to display Los pies de San Juan, a photographic essay by Eduardo Lalo at Fundación Biblioteca's Centro de Investigación y Política Pública (Center for Research and Public Policy. Upon the death of Rafael Hernández Colón in May 2019, the structure was used for his viewing; his body lay in state in the main gallery of this library.

== See also ==
- List of libraries in Ponce, Puerto Rico
