= Archivo Histórico de Ponce =

Historical archive in Ponce, Puerto Rico

- Archivo Histórico de Ponce
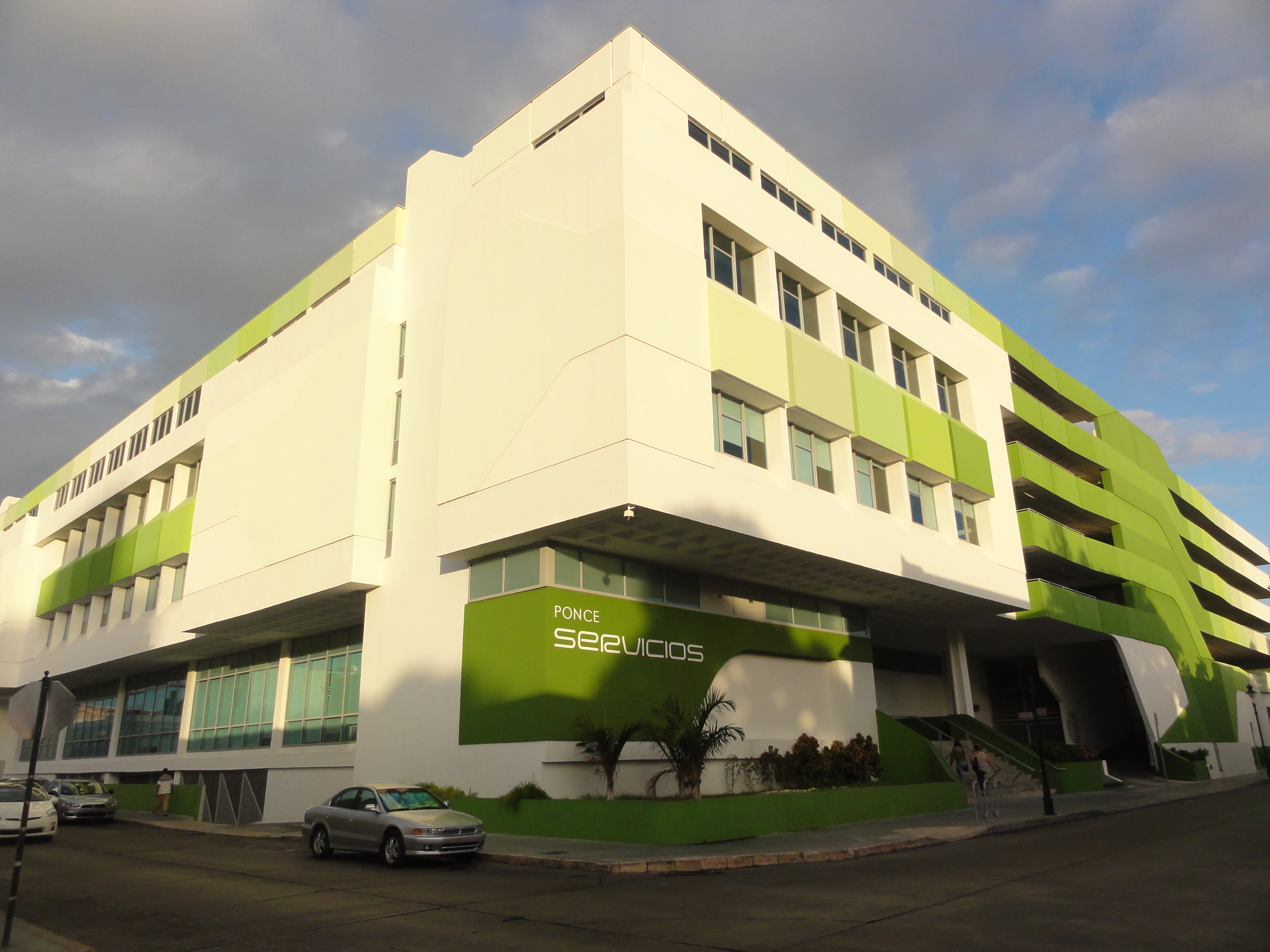
- Current location of Archivo Histórico de Ponce at the grid formed by Calles Guadalupe, Salud, Estrella, and Mayor
- 18.01575°N 66.61216°W
- Location: Ponce Servicios, Ponce, Puerto Rico
- Type: Government Archive
- Established: 1812
- Service area: Puerto Rico as well as researchers from other countries

Collection
- Items collected: Letters, maps, brochures, photos, newspaper clippings, newspapers, microfilms, cancelled municipal payroll checks, municipal employee files, books. Also registry of slaves, architectural plans, films, and sound tracks.
- Size: Over 1 million items indexed in more than 300,000 files
- Criteria for collection: City government documents about the founding, history and evolution of Ponce from the 1812 Municipal Assembly until the present

Access and use
- Access requirements: Historian, university professor, legislator, and researcher
- Circulation: 0
- Population served: Historians, legislators, university professors, and researchers
- Members: 18,000

Other information
- Director: Gladys Esther Tormes Gonzalez
- Employees: 32
- Website: http://ponce.inter.edu/cai/connections/html/archivo.html

Archivo Histórico de Ponce, officially, Archivo Histórico de Ponce Gladys E. Tormes González, is a historical archive in Ponce, Puerto Rico. It is considered "the most complete historical archive in Puerto Rico".

== History ==
As early as 1882, there already existed an Office at the Ponce City Hall, called "Archivo de la Secretaria del Municipio de Ponce", charged as custodian of such records. The first two archivists were Dimas Gilas and Enrique León. The idea of conserving the documented patrimony of the city in a systematic fashion took shape during the administration of Mayor Grillasca in the 1940s but the Archive itself existed long before that. In 1973, Mayor Luis A. Morales revived the project almost immediately after he took office, consulting with the Instituto de Cultura Puertorriqueña regarding its future. Agreeing that the facilities available at City Hall were not adequate to hold such a growing collection, on 19 June 1975 Mayor Morales moved the Archivo to a space next to Teatro La Perla that had just been vacated by the municipal library. In 1995, the Archivo was moved again, this time to Calle Marina, across from Plaza Degetau, at the location where the former Felipe Garcia store was. This move to the former location of the Felipe Garcia store was intended as a temporary location until the new building for the Archivo was completed at the former location of the Puerto Rico District Court building on Bulevar Miguel Pou. However, upon completion of the new building in 2007, only the Ponce Public Library occupied the new building, and the Archivo remained at the former Felipe Garcia location. In 2013, the Archivo moved to its current location at the Ponce Servicios building.

== Contents ==
Researchers at the Archivo Histórico de Ponce

The Archivo Histórico de Ponce comprises all the documentation generated by the agencies of the municipality of Ponce as well as donations by private citizens. It also contains documentation about other municipalities in Puerto Rico. Archivo Histórico has some 100 million archived documents. Among these are letters, maps, brochures, photos, newspaper clippings, full newspaper samples, microfilms, cancelled municipal payroll checks, municipal employee files, books, and other similar documents. These are archived in some 300,000 files. They are archived under the card catalog system. Other documents kept there are an entire registry of slaves, architectural plans, films, soundtracks, and newspapers dating to 1874, as well as city government documents about the founding, history, and evolution of Ponce from the 1812 Municipal Assembly until the present.

== Operational structure ==
It operates in a physically and organizationally centralized fashion. The building has some 19,700 square feet of space and is distributed over three levels. Archivo Histórico has 32 employees. Among its employees are 12 professional archivists.

== Patrons ==
Archivo Histórico receives over 18,000 visitors every year, including historians, university professors, legislators, and researchers from Puerto Rico and abroad.

== Location ==
The Archivo has been located in different headquarters over the years. It was originally located at the Ponce City Hall. During the mayoral administration of Luis A. Morales (1973–1976), it was moved to the second floor of Teatro La Perla on 19 June 1975. It subsequently moved to Calle Marina across from Plaza Las Delicias in the facility that for many years held the Felipe Garcia department store. Around 2014 it moved to the Ponce Servicios building, where it remains today (2018). In August 2023, it was moved to the street Regimiento 65 de Infantería, just across the Ponce Servicios building as a result of the 2020 Earthquakes in southern Puerto Rico.

== Head archivists ==
This is a chronological listing of the head archivists of Archivo Historico de Ponce:

- Dimas Gila (? – 20 December 1882)
- Enrique León (20 December 1882 – 24 January 1890)
- Ramón Dapena (24 January 1890 – ??)
- Carlos Giorgetti and Ulises Olivieri ( ?? – 16 June 1915)
- Ernesto Esbri Roubert (16 June 1915 – ??)
- Antonio Mirabal ( ?? – 1966)
- Billy Fourquet (1966–1967)
- Leopoldo Ruíz (1968–1973)
- Acasio Torres (1973–74)
- Gladys E. Tormes (15 April 1974 – incumbent)

== See also ==
- Ponce, Puerto Rico
- List of people from Ponce, Puerto Rico
- List of libraries in Ponce, Puerto Rico
