= Ponce Municipal Library =

Library in Puerto Rico

Mariana Suárez de Longo Municipal Library
- Biblioteca Municipal Mariana Suárez de Longo
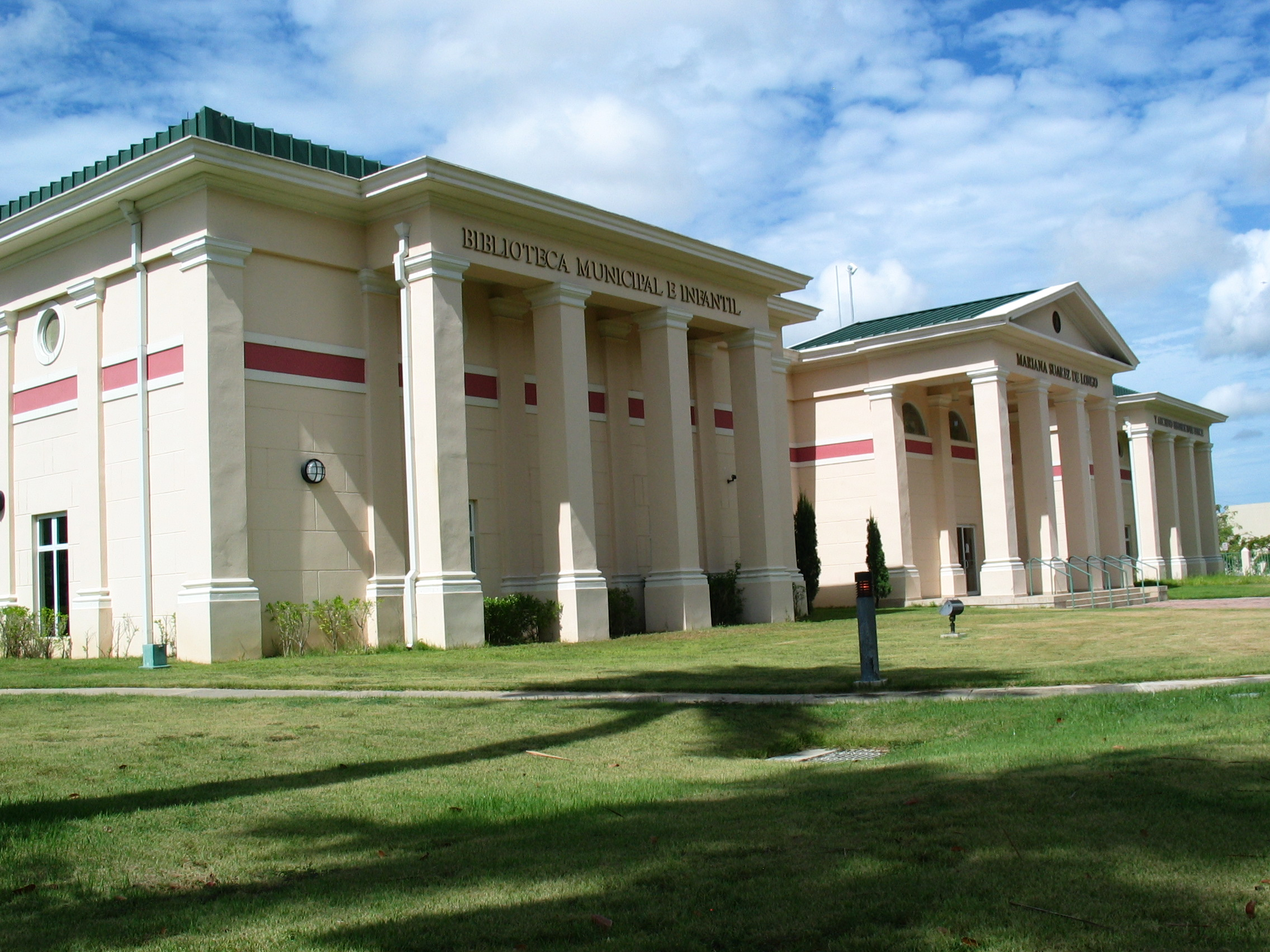
- Headquarters of the Ponce Public Library in Barrio San Antón, Ponce, Puerto Rico
- 18.01223°N 66.60339°W
- Location: Boulevard Miguel Pou, Barrio San Antón, Ponce, Puerto Rico, Puerto Rico
- Type: Public library
- Established: 1870
- Branches: 7 Within the city: Clausells (Guillermo Jackson) at Victoria & Villa Madrid; Jaime L. Drew (Jose Rodriguez Ayala) at José Gautier Benítez Elementary School (closed 2018); Playa (Rafaela Prieto Library) at Avenida Hostos Final; Outside the city: Coto Laurel at Los Santos and PR-14, Llanos del Sur; Guaraguao (Old Head Start building) on PR-516; Magueyes (Rosario La Torre) at PR-123, Km. 15.8; Quebrada Limón on PR-502 and PR-520.

Collection
- Size: 3,000 books + 60,000+ periodicals

Access and use
- Population served: 166,327

Other information
- Budget: $500,000
- Director: Ms. Jo Arleen Torres Hernández
- Employees: 39
- Website: bibliotecaponce.wordpress.com
- References: Las Fiestas Populares de Ponce. Ramon Marin.

The Ponce Municipal Library, formally, Biblioteca Municipal Mariana Suárez de Longo (English: Mariana Suárez de Longo Municipal Library), and also known as Biblioteca Publica de Ponce (English: Ponce Public Library), is the library system of the municipality of Ponce, Puerto Rico. Founded in 1870, it is the oldest public library in Puerto Rico. The system has its main library on Miguel Pou Boulevard, in barrio San Antón, in the city of Ponce, and seven satellite library branches, three in the city's urban area and four spread out in the municipality's rural areas. The main library inaugurated a new building on Bulevar Miguel Pou in August 2007, where the former Puerto Rico District Court building was located. The central library building on Bulevar Miguel Pou was designed by Ponce architect Juan Dalmau Sambolín.

== History ==
=== Gabinete de Lectura ===
The origins of the Ponce Municipal Library date to the establishment in Ponce of the "Gabinete de Lectura" in 1869–1870, founded by Alejandro Tapia y Rivera. The books from the Gabinete de Lectura, the personal collection of Don Miguel Rosich and miscellaneous purchases were used to stock the Public Library. The Gabinete de Lectura was the first educational, cultural, and scientific center in Ponce. The Gabinete was established in 1870 by Federico Perez, Antonio Molina Jr., Diego Vicente Texeira, Rafael Rodriguez, Luis R. Velazquez, Angel Aguerrevera, and Eduardo Neumann Gandía, and was located on Calle Sol. The central government in San Juan closed it down in 1874 out of fear that the common people would become educated and rebel against the government. However, it was reopened in 1876 by a group of people that included some of its original founders plus Dr. Rafael Pujals, Oscar Schuck, Alfredo Casals, Antonio Molina, Ramon Rivera, Jacobo Tur, Sergio Cuevas Zequeira, Juan Cuevas Aboy, Oriol Pasarell, Francisco Oliver, Manuel Mayoral Barnes, and Manuel Yordan. It was re-established on 8 April 1877 with Rafael Pujals, Jose A. Renta, Julio Chardon, Ramon Marin, Baldomero San Antonio, Luis Lassise, Antonio Perez Guerra, Eduardo Salichs, Juan J. Mayoral, Pedro P. Valdivieso, Eduardo Neumann Gandia, Rafael Rodriguez, and Luis Velazquez as its directors.

=== The first library ===
The Ponce Municipal Library was formally founded in 1890 and re-organized in 1894. This first library was located on the first floor of Casa Alcaldia building, on what is now Calle Plaza Degetau, but at the time was considered part of Calle Villa. It contained 1,500 volumes that came from the "Gabinete de Lectura", the private collection of Manuel Rosich, a prominent local educator, and donations from citizens at large. The first librarian was Joaquin Figueroa. The library started with 809 books and 669 pamphlets. By 1913, the total number of volumes was over 4,754, including 2,818 books and 1,936 periodicals. In 1937, the library was restarted under the leadership of Luis A. Ferre. The library later relocated to Calle Isabel in the Ponce Historic Zone. In 1940, mayor Jose Tormos Diego reconditioned the northern annex of Teatro La Perla to be used as the headquarters of the Ponce municipal library.

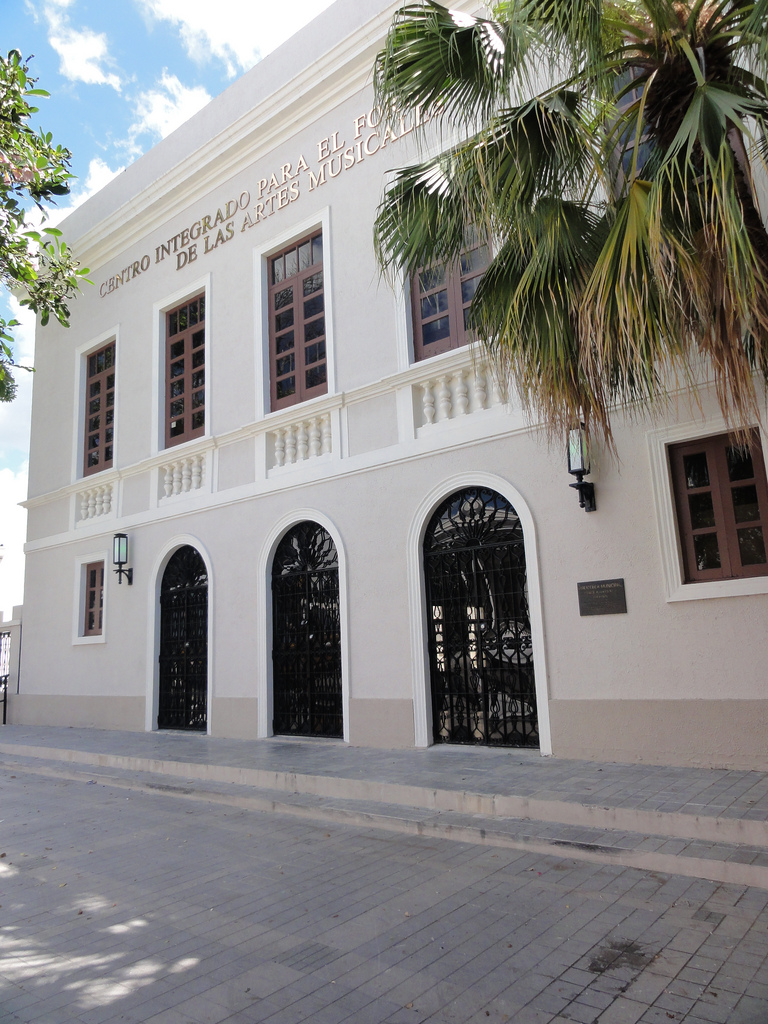
Former location of the Ponce Municipal Library next to Teatro La Perla in Barrio Tercero, Ponce, Puerto Rico, now (2011) serves as headquarters of the Ponce Municipal Band and other musical arts organizations

Originally a non-circulating library, in 1945 the Ponce Public Library instituted a home loan system guaranteed by deposits. The majority of its readers were school children. By 1946 the Ponce Public Library collection had increased to 9,648 volumes, mostly of general character, but completely catalogued according to the Dewey system. In 1946 the library was mostly supported by the Ponce Lions Club and the Asociación Bibliotecaria de Puerto Rico, a sort of "friends of the library" organization. At least by 1947, the library was located on the second level of the Teatro La Perla. Luis A. Ferre was one of the sponsors of the Ponce Public Library and, in the 1950s, several of the works of art that would later be part of the collections at Museo de Arte de Ponce, first hung from the walls of the Public Library on the second floor of Teatro La Perla.

In 1971, construction on the north side of Teatro La Perla was completed and, during the administration of mayor Juan H. Cintron (1968–1972), the library moved to new facilities next to Teatro La Perla, where it remained until 2007.

=== Current facility ===
Construction of the new facility at Bulevar Miguel Pou started in December 2004, completed in January 2007, and the library opened in April 2007. The building cost was $8.5M USD, with another $2M used to furnish it, for a total cost of $10.5M.

The city moved its central library to the new facility in August 2007. The modern facility opened over three years after the untimely death of its proud mastermind and instigator, "the beloved Ponce Mayor Rafael Churumba Cordero".

== Main library building ==
The main library is located in a new building on Miguel Pou Boulevard, barrio San Anton, Ponce, at 18° 0' 44" N, 66° 36' 12" W. The new structure opened in August 2007 under the administration of Mayor Francisco Zayas Seijo and cost $14 million to build. The new building is located at the site of the old Tribunal de Ponce (English: Ponce Judicial Center), which was demolished to give way for the library.

Facilities also include an exhibition hall for art expositions and other similar public events of cultural and civic nature. The library's courtyard provides unrestricted wireless Internet access per the library's hotspot policy and provides an environment suitable for book presentations, storytelling activities, lectures and cocktails.

=== Mariana Suárez de Longo ===
The Main Library was named after Mariana Suárez de Longo, a much admired “Teacher of Teachers”. Suarez de Longo was born on 3 January 1906 in Aibonito, Puerto Rico, graduated from Ponce High School in 1923, and obtained a bachelor's degree in education from the University of Puerto Rico at Rio Piedras in 1935. Suarez de Longo then committed almost 40 years of her life to the education of the island's youth. In 1946, she became the first Puerto Rican woman to be designated School Superintendent, commanding the Ponce area from 1950 to 1962. In 1954 she obtained a master's degree in Management and Supervision from New York University. From 1963 to 1966 she directed the Department of Education’s southern region, comprising fourteen municipalities. In 1966 she served as director of the Division of Curriculum of Puerto Rico's Department of Education. In 1969, Suarez de Longo directed the Staff Training Center of the Ponce Municipal Head Start program. The devoted educator retired in 1972. She died in Ponce on 13 January 1995.

== Satellite libraries ==
No.	Branch Name	Target Population	Barrio	Locality	Opened	Focus	References
1	Guillermo Jackson	Urban	Segundo	Clausells	1960	Traditional	
2	Jose Rodríguez Ayala	Urban	Sexto	Jaime L. Drew/Escuela José Gautier Benítez (closed in 2018)	???	Traditional	
3	Rafaela Prieto de Gonzalez	Urban	Playa	Escuela Segundo Ruiz Belvis and Santiago González	Oct 1962	Traditional	
4	Coto Laurel	Urban	Coto Laurel	Llanos del Sur/Escuela Superior Juan Serralles	1960	Traditional	
5	Guaraguao	Rural	Guaraguao	Edificio Head Start	???	Traditional	
6	Rosario Latorre	Rural	Magueyes	Corral Viejo	???	Traditional	
7	Quebrada Limón	Rural	Quebrada Limón	La Joya de Francia	???	Digital	

In 2018, another digital center was located at the Ponce Servicios building.

== Research branch ==
Originally envisioned to be co-located with the public library was the Archivo Histórico de Ponce (Ponce Historical Archive). The Archivo Histórico de Ponce is a library research tool about the municipality, and is currently (2011) located on Calle Marina and Plaza Degetau in the Ponce Historic Zone. In 2016, it moved to the renovated Ponce Servicios Building.

The Ponce Historical Archive boasts collections of newspapers published in the city from the 18th through the 21st century, including La Gaceta de Puerto Rico, El Aguila de Puerto Rico, El Universal, El Diario de Puerto Rico among others. Also archived there is La Perla del Sur.

== Services ==
The Ponce Municipal Library offers among its services a nearly half-million dollars virtual education center with access to over 30 digital services covering subjects from Auto Repair to Health and Medicine to Literature to encyclopedias and dictionaries with a fleet of some 150 computers. There is a Mi Rincón de Lectura (English: Children's Reading Corner) providing a setting for parents who want to read to their kids. The two-story main library structure also has a youth library, sponsored by the international children's literature introductory program known as PIALI, Programa Internacional de Acercamiento a la Literatura Infantil (English: International Children's Literature Introductory Program). The library is also a center for the temporary exposition of visual arts.

== Head librarians ==
- J. Joaquin Figueroa (ca. 1890 – ca. 1913)
- Georgina Lazaro (ca.1980 – ca.1990)
- Adelina Coppin Alvarado (ca.1990 – ca.2002)

== See also ==
- List of libraries in Ponce, Puerto Rico
- Archivo Histórico de Ponce
