= Albergue de Niños de Ponce =

Orphanage in Canas Urbano, Ponce, Puerto Rico

Coordinates: 18°00′38.3394″N 66°38′12.228″W

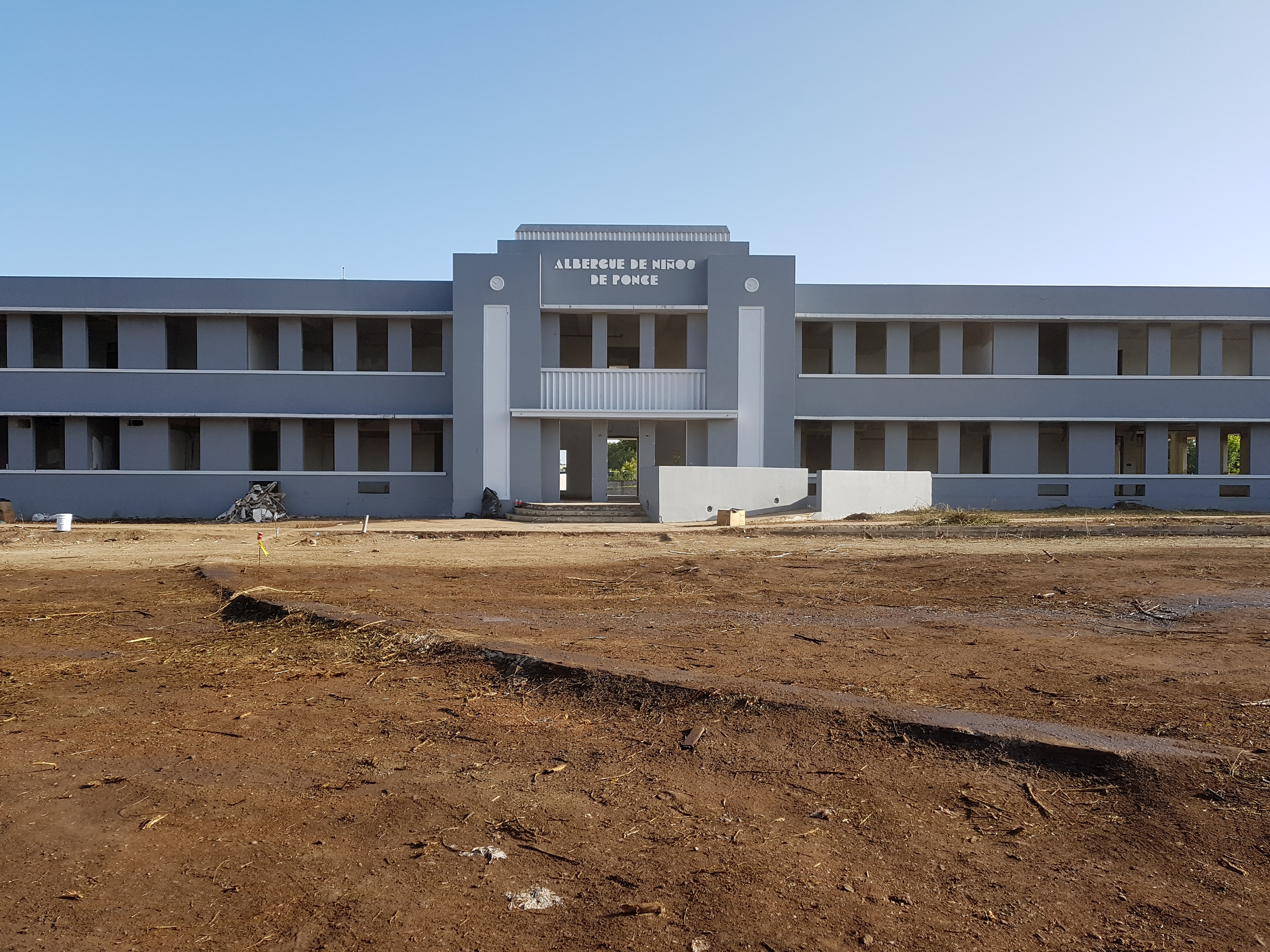
- Albergue de Niños de Ponce, Barrio Canas, Ponce, Puerto Rico, during restoration in September 2019
- Founded: 1931
- Founded at: Ponce, Puerto Rico
- Type: Non-profit NGO
- Legal status: 501(c)(3)
- Purpose: Provide short and long-term residential safe space and support services for homeless, orphan boys.
- Headquarters: Calle Villa Final, Ponce, Puerto Rico
- Services: Drop-in center, Street Outreach Program, transitional living, and emergency housing shelter
- Founder: Juan Luis Boscio
- President: Ivan R. Ayala Cruz
- Padrino (Godfather): Javier Culson
- Expenses: $1.5 Million (2019)

Albergue de Niños de Ponce (Ponce Shelter for Boys) was a shelter for orphan boys originally located in Barrio Canas Urbano in Ponce, Puerto Rico, and later moving to permanent quarters in Barrio Canas, also in Ponce. The not-for-profit shelter operated from 1931 to around 1985.

== Mission ==
By 1931, when the shelter opened, the city of Ponce already offered facilities for the blind ("Asilo de Ciegos de Ponce"), the elderly poor ("Asilo de Mendigos de Ponce") and the homeless ("Asilo de Huérfanos de Ponce"). In addition, it also had a shelter for the mentally-incapacitated ("Asilo de Locos"). However, it had no shelter for orphan boys. Albergue de Niños de Ponce filled this need. The shelter's mission was to provide shelter for homeless orphan children.

== History ==
Juan Luis Boscio (1896 - 1980), a local businessman and later mayor of Ponce (1961 - 1964), was one of the founders of the Albergue de Niños de Ponce. The shelter was founded in 1931 on the north side of Calle Villa in Barrio Canas, between Calle Cementerio Civil and Calle Central. Albergue de Niños later moved to the a new masonry structure located on the south side of Calle Villa, between Escuela Jaime L. Drew, and PR-500. Among its directors was Jaime L. Drew, a prominent educator from Ponce.

The facility had room for 170 homeless orphan boys and consisted of 22 cuerdas (8.6 hectares; 21 acres), including an area for agriculture.

== Today ==
A local non-profit foundation, the Ivan Ayala Kidz Cancer Foundation, is currently (2019) looking to use the former Albergue de Niños building on Calle Villa Final as a hospital for children with cancer, and affiliate it to St. Jude Children's Research Hospital. Construction of the Steven Anthony Children’s Hospital started on 16 November 2019.

== See also ==
- Timeline of Ponce, Puerto Rico
- History of Puerto Rico
