= Iván Ayala Cádiz =

Puerto Rican politician

Iván H. Ayala Cádiz
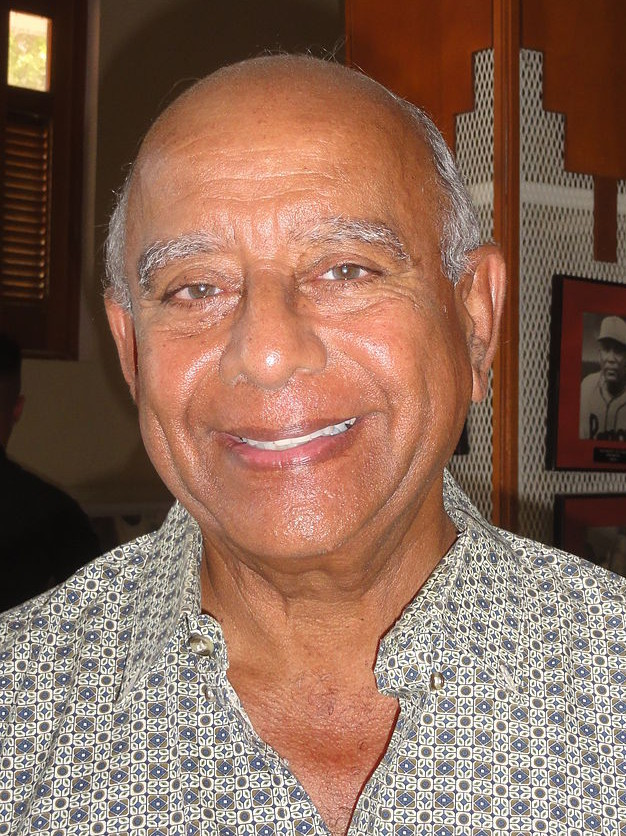
- Mayor Iván H. Ayala Cádiz

131st Mayor of Ponce, Puerto Rico
- In office 1987 – 2 January 1989
- Preceded by: José Dapena Thompson
- Succeeded by: Rafael Cordero Santiago

Personal details
- Born: c. 1940 Ponce, Puerto Rico
- Party: New Progressive Party (PNP)
- Spouse: Vivian Cruz
- Children: Vilmarie, Héctor Ivan, Ivan Rafael
- Occupation: Professor
- Profession: Lawyer, professor

Iván H. Ayala Cádiz (Note: In this Spanish name, the first or paternal surname is Ayala and the second or maternal family name is Cádiz.) (born c. 1940) is a university professor and attorney. He was mayor of Ponce, Puerto Rico after the resignation of mayor José Dapena Thompson in 1988, and until 2 January 1989.

== Assignment ==
Ayala Cádiz was previously assistant dean at the Pontifical Catholic University of Puerto Rico School of Law. He completed Dapena Thompson's last few weeks mayoral term (December 1988 to January 1989) via appointment by his political party, the PNP. In 1988, former elected mayor Dapena Thompson was charged as co-author of embezzlement of federal funds from HUD; as a result he resigned as mayor. Ayala Cádiz had also been a Superior Court Judge in 2004.

== See also ==
- List of Puerto Ricans

Political offices
Preceded by José Dapena Thompson	Mayor of Ponce, Puerto Rico; 1987 – 2 January 1989	Succeeded by Rafael Cordero Santiago
