= Complejo Ferial de Puerto Rico =

Convention center in Ponce, Puerto Rico

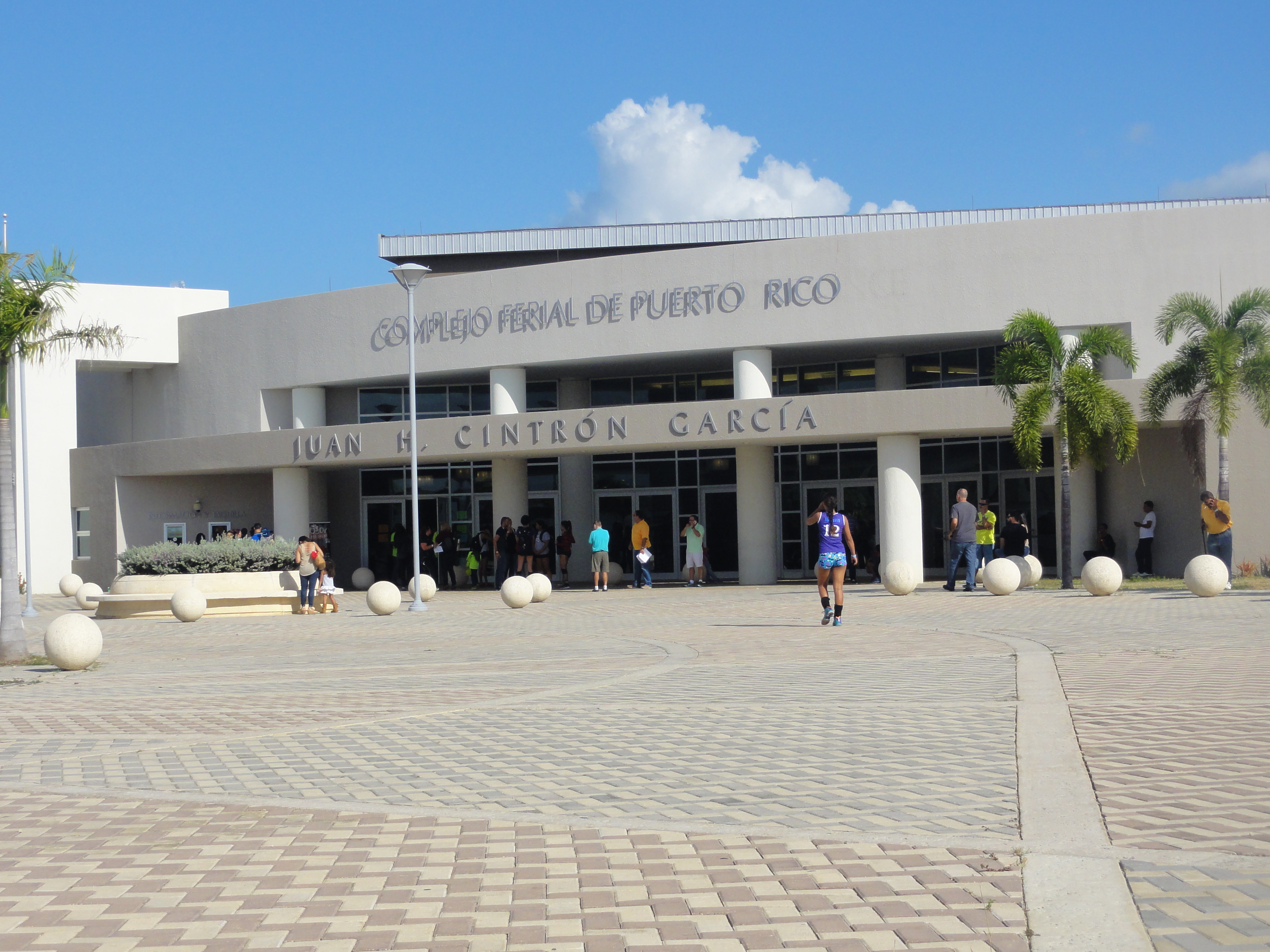
- Complejo Ferial de Puerto Rico, also known as Centro de Convenciones de Ponce (Ponce Convention Center)
- Interactive map of Complejo Ferial de Puerto Rico
- Former names: Centro de Convenciones de Ponce
- Address: PR-52 and PR-12 at Avenida Rafael Churumba Santiago
- Location: Ponce, Puerto Rico
- Coordinates: 18°0′28.1514″N 66°36′22.7514″W
- Owner: Government of the Autonomous Municipality of Ponce
- Operator: Intertrade Development Group

Construction
- Built: 2008-2012
- Opened: June 2012
- Cost: $43.7 million

Website
- www.complejoferialpr.com

Complejo Ferial de Puerto Rico, is a 3,000-seat indoor arena and convention center in Ponce, Puerto Rico. It is intended to be used primarily for trade shows, conventions and sporting events. It opened in June, 2012. One of the first pre-inauguration activities was a set of Olympic boxing pre-match games. Its official inauguration was subsequently set for September 2012. However, its official inauguration took place on 11 October 2012.

Variously known as Centro de Convenciones de Ponce, Centro de Convenciones de Ponce Juan H. Cintrón, and Complejo Ferial de Puerto Rico Juan H. Cintrón Garcia, the center was built to serve the local as well as the international business market. The Centro de Convenciones de Ponce was named after former Ponce Mayor Juan H. Cintrón García. Centro de Convenciones de Ponce is unique among other convention centers in Puerto Rico for the flexibility of its interior spaces. It is owned by the Autonomous Municipality of Ponce.

== History ==
Construction of the structure started on 20 October 2008, under the administration of Mayor Francisco Zayas Seijo. The building design was commissioned to architect Fernando Gonzalez Diaz and his architectural firm Urban Venture Group. Urban Venture Group with their consultants; Pedro Dario Del Nero (structural engineer), Jorge Ledón Webster (mechanical engineer), Ricardo Rodriguez Del Valle (electrical engineer), Alfred J. Longhitano (codes) and Manuel Quilichini (civil engineer), formed the team that developed the Architecture and Interior design of "Complejo Ferial de Puerto Rico". The structure was built by local Ponce construction company Venegas Construction. It was ordered by the Autonomous Municipality of Ponce at a cost of $41 million USD, excluding its access roads and parking lot. These engaged an additional $3.9 million. Some 400 workmen labored in the construction of the structure.

== Management ==
The Center is managed by a public municipal corporation independent of the Municipal Government but which reports to it. The corporation is headed by a five-member governing board. According to current by-laws of the municipality, one of the members of the governing body must be the municipal finance director, and the other four members are appointed by the mayor. The primary objective in creating a municipal corporation for the management and administration of Centro de Convenciones is "to exempt it from being bound by the bureaucracy required by the Law of Autonomous Municipalities" One of the obligations of the new corporation is to sign a long-term contract with an operator for the administration and day-to-day operation of the Center. Various companies were mentioned as potential managers and interested parties, including SMG Worldwide Entertainment and Convention Venue Management, Intertrade Development Group, and Grupo Serralles, owners of the Ponce Hilton Resort and Casino. In the end, Intertrade Development Group was chosen as the operator.

== Features ==
The building is a two-story structure. The main exhibit hall features 120,000 square feet of exhibit space. The main exhibit hall can be structured into 16 smaller and independent mixed-used rooms to simultaneously accommodate various activities, such as conventions, concerts, weddings, and corporate meetings. Each of the 16 rooms will have its own independently controlled climate and sound systems. The property also features a planned parking lot with capacity for 700 vehicles. There is also an area with a view of Rio Portugues with a capacity for 300 persons. The Puerto Rico Senate voted to name this structure "Centro de Convenciones de Ponce Juan H. Cintron" in honor to the Ponce politician.

== Notable events ==
An international design festival, Boom Fair 2013, took place during August 2013. A cardiovascular health symposium, sponsored by Hospital Episcopal San Lucas, followed on 24 August 2013.
