= Eduardo Ruberté Bisó =

Puerto Rican politician

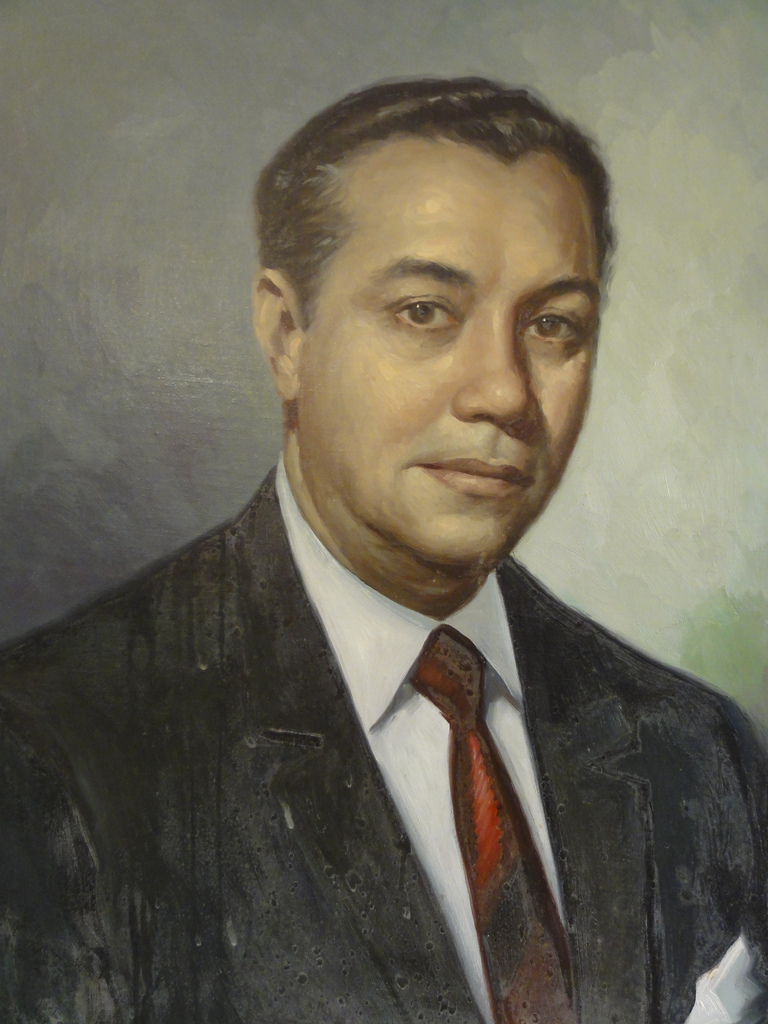
- Mayor Eduardo Ruberté Bisó

126th Mayor of Ponce, Puerto Rico
- In office 1964–1968
- Preceded by: Juan Luis Boscio
- Succeeded by: Juan H. Cintrón García

Personal details
- Born: 5 May 1918
- Died: 30 March 1996 (aged 77) Ponce, Puerto Rico
- Spouse: Olga Huertas
- Relations: Olga Ruberte
- Profession: Real estate broker

Eduardo Ruberté Bisó (5 May 1918 – 30 March 1996) was a Puerto Rican real estate broker and Mayor of Ponce, Puerto Rico, from 1964 to 1968.

== Early years ==
Ruberté Bisó was the son of Dario Ruberté Casiano and Maria Bisó Hernandez, and married Eugenia Cordero Suárez on 7 June 1942. Ruberté Bisó had a sister from the same marriage, 7 years his younger, named Matilde. He worked as an assistant bookkeeper in the banking industry. His second wife was Olga Huertas. Later he worked his way into real estate brokerage.

== Mayoral term ==
Ruberté Bisó is best remembered for the inauguration of the new city cemetery in the El Yeso sector of the city, near the community of Jaime L. Drew. He is also remembered for having dealt successfully with a citywide strike by municipal sanitation workers.

== Death and legacy ==
Ruberté Bisó died in Cuarto, Ponce, Puerto Rico, on 30 March 1996. The cause of his death was "cardio-respiratory arrest." He was buried at Cementerio La Piedad in Ponce. In Ponce, there is a street that bears his name, located in the Pampanos sector of Barrio Canas. The road is signed PR-585 and it leads from Barrio Canas to Barrio Playa.

== See also ==
- List of Puerto Ricans

Political offices
Preceded by Juan Luis Boscio	Mayor of Ponce, Puerto Rico; 1964–1968	Succeeded by Juan H. Cintrón García
