= Juan H. Cintrón García =

Puerto Rican politician

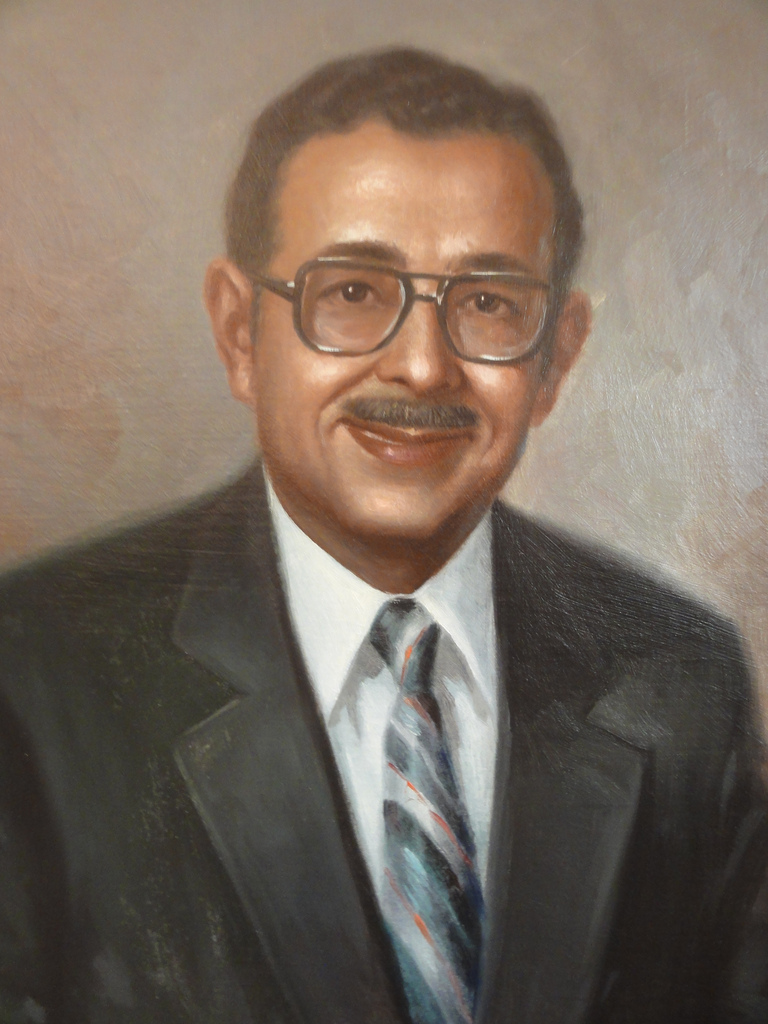
- Mayor Juan H. Cintron Garcia

127th Mayor of Ponce, Puerto Rico
- In office 1968–1972
- Preceded by: Eduardo Ruberté Bisó
- Succeeded by: Luis A. Morales

Personal details
- Born: 11 March 1919 Ponce, Puerto Rico
- Died: 22 September 2012 (aged 93) Ponce, Puerto Rico
- Party: New Progressive Party (PNP)
- Spouse: Elba Cintrón Ruiz
- Children: Elba Lilian, Elena Herminia, Ileana del Carmen
- Education: Pontifical Catholic University of Puerto Rico (BA)
- Profession: Businessman

Military service
- Allegiance: United States
- Branch/service: United States Army; Army National Guard
- Rank: Coronel

Juan Herminio Cintrón García (11 March 1919 – 22 September 2012) was a Puerto Rican politician and Mayor of Ponce, Puerto Rico, from 1968 to 1972. Under his administration the city of Ponce saw the construction of the Coliseo Juan "Pachín" Vicéns and the Centro Gubernamental de Ponce on Avenida Las Americas.

== Early years ==
Cintron García was born in Ponce, Puerto Rico in 1919. He was the second child of Arturo Cintrón Gonzalez, a businessman, and Herminia Garcia Mercado, a school teacher. He attended elementary and middle school in Ponce public schools and graduated from Ponce High School in 1936. After performing in the business of his father for several years, he earned his bachelor's degree in business administration from Pontifical Catholic University of Puerto Rico in 1971. He was concurrently acting as mayor of Ponce while he did his college work. On 3 February 1946, he married Elba Cintron Ruiz.

== Career ==
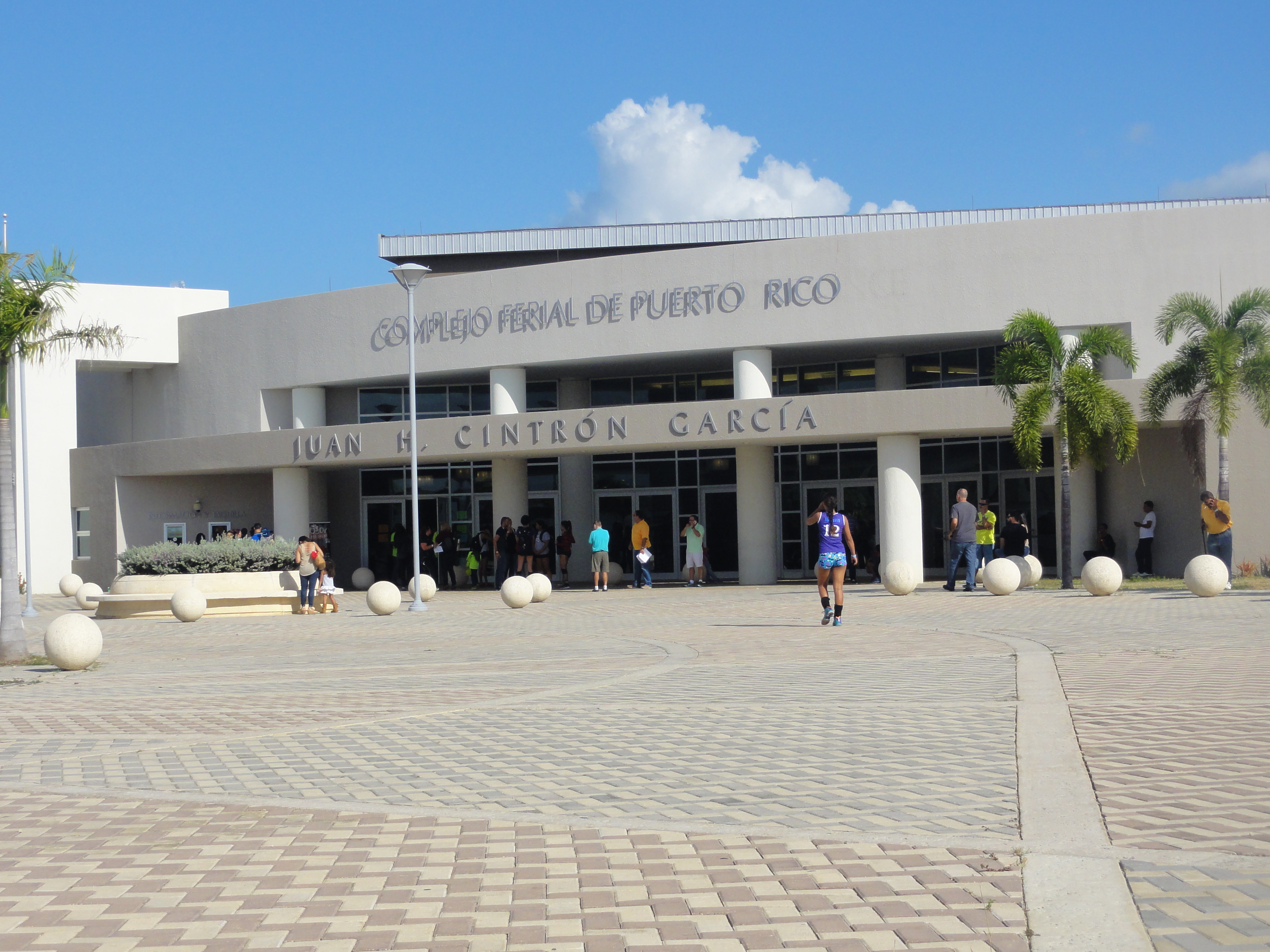
Complejo Ferial de Puerto Rico, Juan H. Cintrón in Ponce

Cintron served as mayor Ponce from 1969 to 1973. During his administration the city built the Juan Pachín Vicéns Auditorium, moved the Ponce Municipal Library to a new facility next to Teatro La Perla, re-organized the Archivo Histórico de Ponce, enlarged the Avenida Las Américas roadway, and opened the Centro Gubernamental de Ponce at Avenida Las Americas and Avenida Hostos. Under his administration the Francisco Montaner Stadium was also remodeled.

Two other projects inaugurated during his administration were the new Puerto Rico Police regional headquarters on Avenida Hostos and the start of the construction of the University of Puerto Rico at Ponce on Ponce Bypass and PR-12. In addition to commencing construction of the University of Puerto Rico at Ponce, for which the Ponce Municipal Government provided $250,000, Cintron Garcia also rebuilt the aging Hospital Municipal Tricoche.

After his mayoral service, Cintron Garcia served as Puerto Rico's Secretary of Commerce from 1977 to 1984 under Governor Carlos Romero Barceló. From 1992 to 1997 he served as municipal assemblyman in Ponce.

He served as a sergeant in the United States Army during World War II and decades later retired as a Colonel in the Puerto Rico National Guard. In 2021 Juan H. Cintrón García was inducted to the Puerto Rico Veterans Hall of Fame.

Cintron Garcia was a founding member of the Ponce YMCA. He also served in its board performing as vicepresident for two years. He was also vicepresident of the Club de Leones de Ponce (the Ponce chapter of the Lions Club International).

== Legacy ==
On 4 February 2011, the PNP-controlled Puerto Rico Senate approved a bill to name the Centro de Convenciones de Ponce (Ponce Convention Center) after Cintron Garcia. However, on 3 February 2011, the bill had been denounced by Ramón Torres Morales, president of the PPD in Ponce, for allegedly conflicting with the Law of Autonomous Municipalities of Puerto Rico. On 23 June 2011 the bill was passed.

== Death ==
Juan H. Cintron died in Ponce on 22 September 2012. He was buried at Ponce's Cementerio La Piedad at Barrio Magueyes in Ponce, Puerto Rico.

== Honors ==
Cintron Garcia is honored at Ponce's Park of Illustrious Ponce Citizens. Only six, of over 100 Ponce mayors, are honored there. A street was named after him at Urbanizacion Estancias del Golf in Ponce. The Puerto Rico & Virgin Islands chapter of the American Legion dedicated its 89th convention in his honor in June 2012. In 2012, the Complejo Ferial de Puerto Rico was renamed Complejo Ferial de Puerto Rico Juan H. Cintron in his honor.

In 2021 Juan H. Cintrón García was posthumously inducted to the Puerto Rico Veterans Hall of Fame.

== See also ==
- Ponce, Puerto Rico
- List of Puerto Ricans
- List of mayors of Ponce, Puerto Rico

Political offices
Preceded by Eduardo Ruberté Bisó	Mayor of Ponce, Puerto Rico; 1968–1972	Succeeded by Luis A. Morales
