= Carlos Juan Cintrón =

Puerto Rican politician

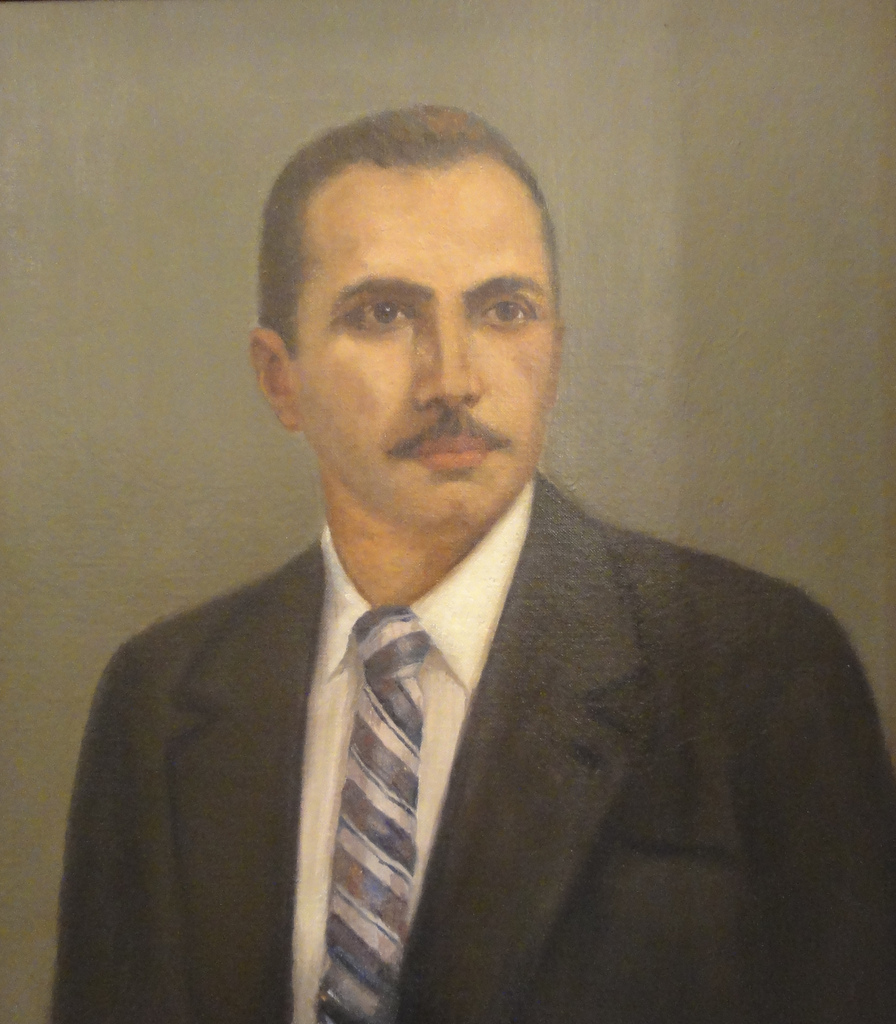
- Mayor Carlos Juan Cintrón

124th Mayor of Ponce, Puerto Rico
- In office 1957–1961
- Preceded by: José Dapena Laguna
- Succeeded by: Juan Luis Boscio

Personal details
- Born: 6 September 1918 Juana Diaz, Puerto Rico
- Died: 5 May 1998 (aged 79) Ponce, Puerto Rico
- Party: PPD
- Spouse(s): 1st: Josefina Fernandez Reyes; 2nd: Rosa Gonzalez
- Children: 1st marriage: Carlos Juan, Rosa Margarita, Lillian, Enrique, Luis, and Lombardo. 2nd marriage: Brenda
- Profession: Politician

Carlos Juan Cintrón Figueroa (6 September 1918 – 5 May 1998) was mayor of Ponce, Puerto Rico from 1957 to 1961. However, in year 1960, during a period while Cintron held his post as mayor, Helvetia Nicole filled in as interim mayor. After his tenure as mayor, Cintrón was president of Puerto Rico's Unión de Trabajadores de Acero (United Steelworkers of America).

== Personal life ==
Cintron Figueroa was born in Barrio Callabos, Juana Diaz, Puerto Rico. He was the son of Luis Cintron Rodriguez and Rosa Maria Figueroa Nazario. He had a brother, 2 years older than him, named Carlos Luis. Cintrón Figueroa married Josefina Fernandez Reyes on 22 May 1936, and fathered seven children (Carlos Juan, Rosa Margarita, Lillian, Enrique, Luis, and Lombardo), in this first marriage. Josefina Fernandez Reyes was Ponce's First Lady during Cintron's tenure as mayor. After his divorce from Fernandez Reyes, he married Rosa Gonzalez from which relationship his seventh child, Brenda, was born.

Carlos Juan Cintron died on May 5, 1998, in Ponce, Puerto Rico at age 79.

== See also ==
- List of Puerto Ricans
- List of mayors of Ponce, Puerto Rico

Political offices
Preceded by José Dapena Laguna	Mayor of Ponce, Puerto Rico; 1957–1961	Succeeded by Juan Luis Boscio
