= José Dapena Thompson =

Puerto Rican politician

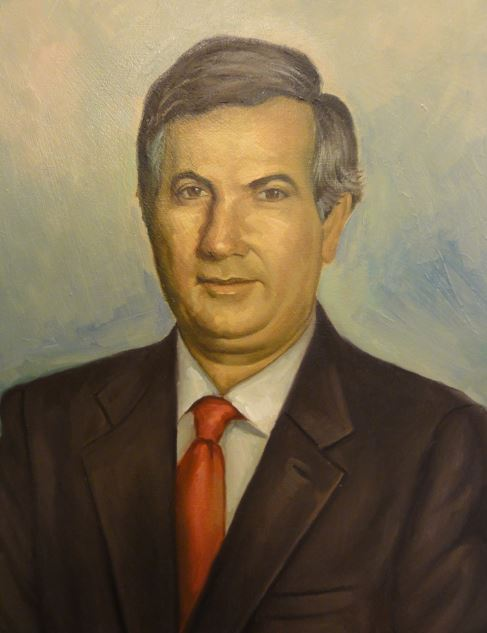
- Mayor Jose G. Dapena Thompson

130th Mayor of Ponce, Puerto Rico
- In office 22 February 1984 – 1988
- Preceded by: José G. Tormos Vega
- Succeeded by: Iván Ayala Cádiz

Personal details
- Born: c. 1938 Ponce, Puerto Rico
- Education: University of Salamanca, Spain
- Profession: Attorney

José Joaquin Dapena Thompson (born c. 1938), known as Josito, was a Puerto Rican politician and Mayor of Ponce, Puerto Rico from 22 February 1984 to 1988.

== Schooling ==
Dapena graduated from the University of Salamanca, Spain, in 1965. He practiced law in the island until he got involved in politics. In 1984, he defeated the candidate from the PPD by a narrow margin for the position of Mayor of Ponce, Puerto Rico.

== Mayoral term ==
Dapena Thompson became mayor of Ponce on 22 February 1984 upon the resignation as mayor of Jose G. Tormos Vega on that day. Later, in October of that year, he became bona fide mayor via the electoral vote. In the interim, Ruben Quinones, the Ponce Municipal Secretary, was the acting mayor. He was mayor until Ivan Ayala Cadiz assumed the mayoral post in December 1987 via nomination of the New Progressive Party. Ayala Cadiz was mayor until January 1989.

== Resignation ==
In 1988, Dapena Thompson was "named an unindicted co-conspirator" of embezzlement of federal funds from HUD. As a result, he resigned as mayor. Ivan Ayala Cadiz, former assistant dean at the Pontifical Catholic University of Puerto Rico School of Law, finished off Dapena Thompson's last few weeks' mayoral term.

== Today ==
Dapena Thompson lived in Ponce and worked with his grandson, David Antonio, as of counsel and notary. He has also served as legal advisor to senator Larry Seilhamer.

== See also ==
- Ponce, Puerto Rico
- List of Puerto Ricans

Political offices
Preceded by José G. Tormos Vega	Mayor of Ponce, Puerto Rico; 1986–1988	Succeeded by Iván Ayala Cádiz
