= Monumento a la Mujer =

Statue commemorating the contributions of Puerto Rican women

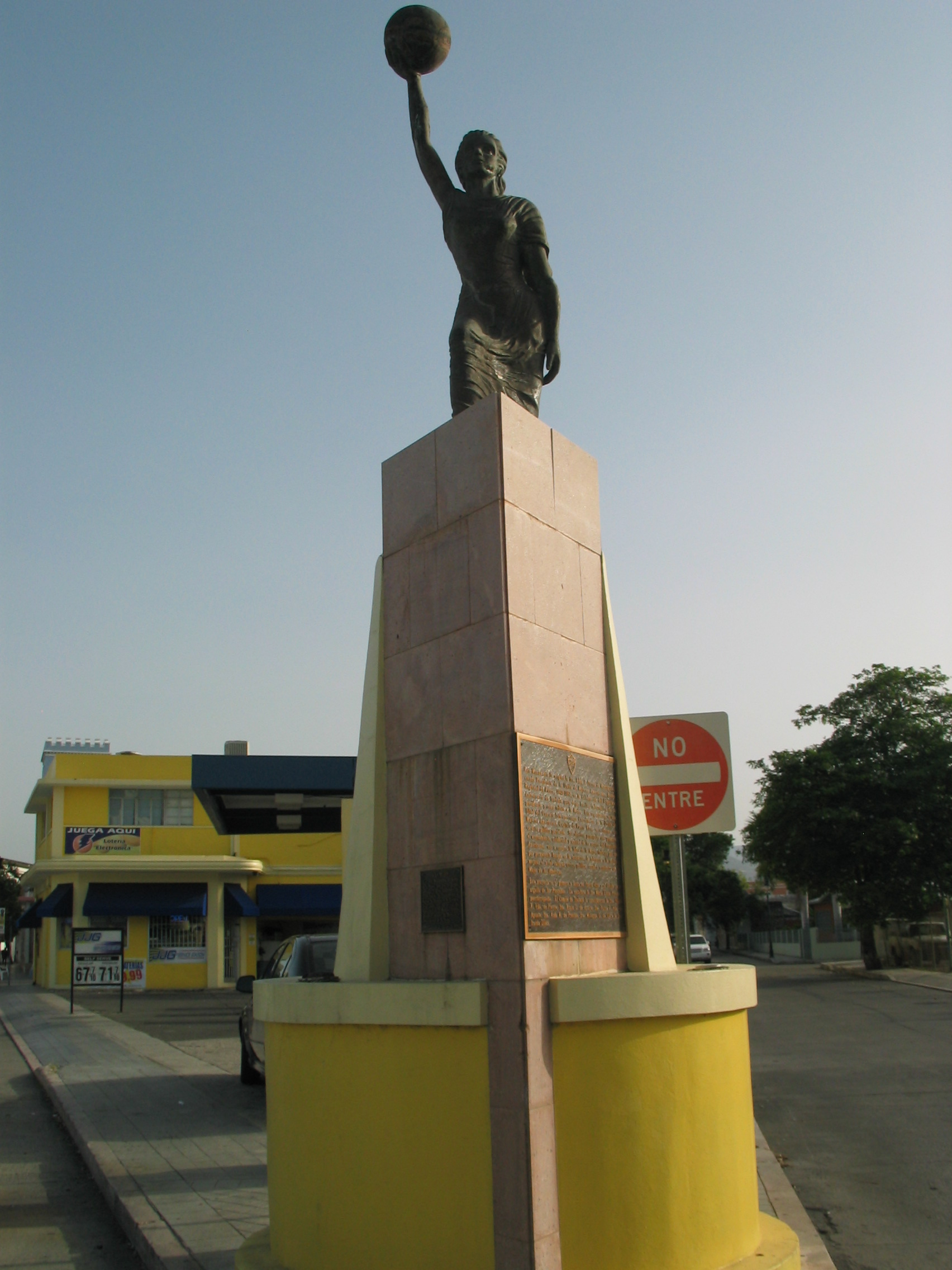

- Location of the statue within Puerto Rico
- Artist: Maria Elena Perales
- Year: 2002
- Type: Bronze
- Medium: Bronze sculpture
- Subject: Puerto Rican women
- Condition: Pristine
- Location: Ponce, Puerto Rico; 18°0′29.268″N 66°36′48.0234″W
- Owner: Municipality of Ponce, PR

Monumento a la Mujer is a bronze statue commemorating the contributions of the Puerto Rican women to the Puerto Rican society. It is located at the fork of Calle Marina and Calle Mayor Cantera, in Ponce, Puerto Rico, next to Parque Urbano Dora Colón Clavell, in Barrio Cuarto. It was unveiled in 2002. Its sculptor was Maria Elena Perales. The monument was the first and, at the time, the only one of its kind "in Puerto Rico and the Caribbean."

== Background ==
With the turn of the century, the role of women in Puerto Rican society had advanced dramatically. There were more women graduating from colleges and universities and more women than ever were entering the fields of politics, public health, management, finance, and even clergy work. At the time, the city of Ponce had just undergone significant improvements in its infrastructure thanks to the Plan Ponce en Marcha. The Ponce chapter of the Union of American Women commissioned a statue be built to commemorate the role of women in that advancement. The result was Monumento a la Mujer.

== Description ==
The statue is 6 feet (1.8 m) high and was forged in Santo Domingo, Dominican Republic. It consists of a young woman with her right arm stretched up high and holding a small depiction of the globe of the Earth on her hand. The statue is supported by a 12-foot (3.7 m) high pedestal in two levels. The top level, 10 feet (3.0 m) high, is built in marble and is supported by a 4-foot (1.2 m) high lower level built in concrete. There is a triangular obelisk that protrudes about 8 inches (20 cm) from the front of the pedestal that, when viewed from certain angles, gives the impression the statue rests on an obelisk. The monument has various plaques commemorating the history behind the monument. There is also a time capsule (5 August 1992 to 5 August 2092) that is buried at the back base of the monument.

The dedicatory plaque on the monument has an inscription that reads (Note: English translation is not part of the inscription, and it is given here to the right):

A LA MUJER Con este Monumento se honra a la Mujer, que por su virtud, esfuerzo y altas cualidades ha contribuido brillantemente a forjar la Historia y la Cultura, logrando asi un sitial de igualdad en el Mundo, siendo siempre imagen de Belleza y transmisora de la Vida. 5 de agosto de 1992	TO THE WOMAN This Monument honors the Woman, who for her virtue, effort and high qualities has contributed brilliantly to forge History and Culture, thus achieving a place of equality in the World, being always an image of Beauty and the transmitter of Life. 5 August 1992

The statue is the work of Puerto Rican sculptor María Elena Perales Guzmán, who is also the sculptor of the busts of Simón Bolívar, Juan Pablo Duarte, José Martí, and Luis Muñoz Marín, at the Plaza de los Proceres Latinoamericanos (Plaza of Latin American statesmen) in Parque del Tricentanario at Bulevar Miguel Pou in Ponce.

== Ponce's Union of American Women ==
The statue was donated by the Ponce chapter of the Union of American Women to the municipality of Ponce. The Union of American Women is a civic organization that advocates for the advancement and participation of women in Puerto Rican society. The project was conceived by the Union's president, Edna J. Torres de Rodriguez (Edna Rodriguez).
