= Jaime L. Drew =

- Born: Jaime Leopoldo Drew Henriquez; 16 September 1876; Ponce, Puerto Rico
- Died: 14 April 1948 (aged 71); Ponce, Puerto Rico
- Occupations: Educator, civil servant, writer, and engineer
- Spouse: Maria Mercedes
- Children: Marcial and Pedro Delgado

Jaime Leopoldo Drew Henriquez (16 September 1876 – 14 April 1948) was an early twentieth-century Puerto Rican educator, civil servant, writer, and engineer from Ponce, Puerto Rico.

== Early years ==
Jaime Leopoldo Drew Henriquez was born in Barrio Playa, Ponce, Puerto Rico, on 16 September 1876, the son of Carlos M. Drew, a Dominican, and Matilde Henriquez, a Puerto Rican woman born in Naguabo. He lived in Ponce until age seven, when his family moved to the Dominican Republic. His family moved back to Ponce when Drew was eleven, and a year later, he moved to England where he completed his elementary and high school education.

== Education ==
After completing his high school training, he entered Wesleyan College of the University of London where he graduated with a bachelor's degree in Arts and Civil Engineering, graduating cum laude. He studied in London, England at Oxford University, becoming the first Puerto Rican to graduate from that university.

== Career ==
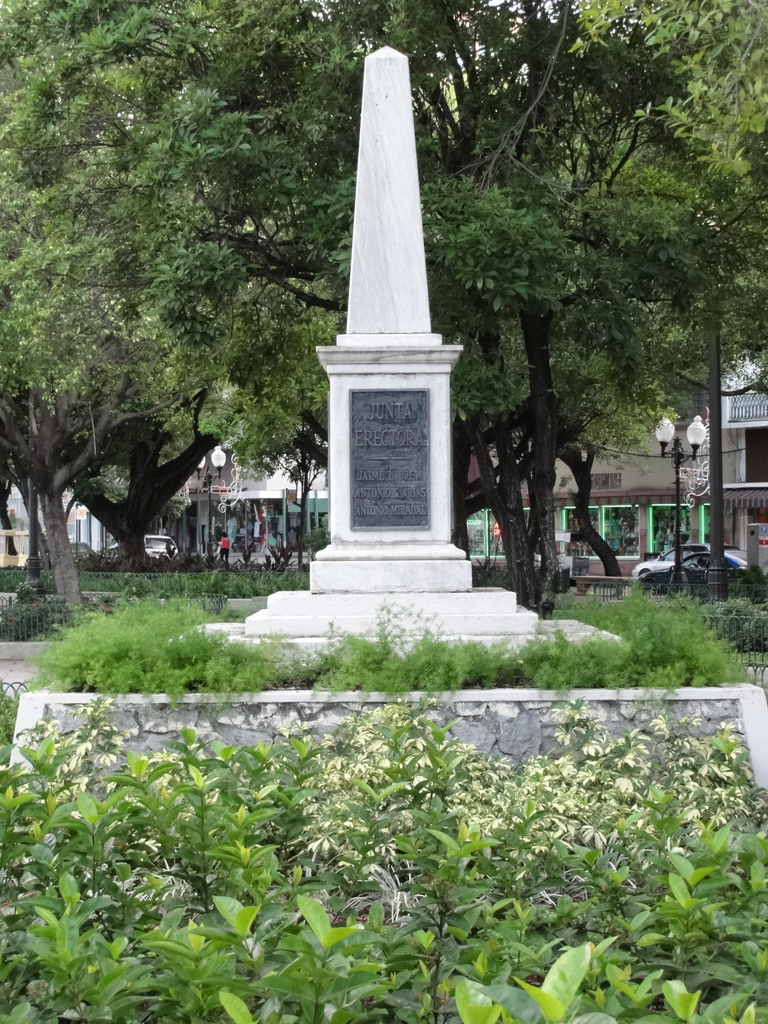
Jaime L. Drew was one of the three Ponce Municipal Board members entrusted with the building of the monument to the El Polvorin firefighters.

After completing his Engineering degree, Drew practiced engineering in Puerto Rico and Venezuela. However, he became interested in the teaching profession instead. His first teaching jobs were in economically deprived rural areas of the Puerto Rican country side, including Adjuntas. He subsequently moved to Ponce to teach in schools in Ponce's urban zone. His teaching subjects included physics, English as a second language, French, and Spanish. Drew spent his life teaching at the Ponce High School, starting under its first principal, Charles H. Terry. He spent 15 years teaching at the Ponce High School, and during his spare time he also taught courses at various business schools in Ponce.

For several years, Drew also held positions as school principal, public schools inspector, and advisor to the Languages Department of the Puerto Rico's Departamento de Instruccion Publica (Department of Public Instruction), now Department of Education. Drew wrote several books, including "Liga de Bondad", "English Idiomatic Expressions", "Short Stories", and "Libro de Poemas en Ingles y Espanol".

At age 41, on 18 July 1918, Drew entered the United States Armed Forces during World War I conflict and held the rank of lieutenant teaching various military courses to the incoming military personnel.

== Extracurricular activities ==
In 1905 Drew became a member of the Freemason society in Adjuntas and, in 1947, he served as head of the Freemason Society in Ponce (Respetable Logia Aurora de Ponce). He was also a Grand Master in the Ponce chapter of the Order of Odd Fellows of America. He also served in the board of directors of Albergue de Niños de Ponce.

== Death ==
A few months before his death, Drew started feeling weak and short of breath. After visiting with Dr. Pila, Drew returned to the classroom for a few months, but started to feel weak again, falling victim to heart disease. He died on 14 April 1948.

== Legacy ==
In northeast Ponce there is a residential sector named after him. In Ponce there is also an elementary school in the Baldorioty community, Barrio Segundo, also named after him. Also in Ponce, he is recognized at the Park for the Illustrious Ponce Citizens. His grave in Ponce at Cementerio Civil de Ponce is oftentimes honored by placing flowers, especially on 7 May, Día del Maestro (Day of the Teacher).

== See also ==
- List of Puerto Ricans
