= José G. Tormos Vega =

Puerto Rican politician (1925–1993)

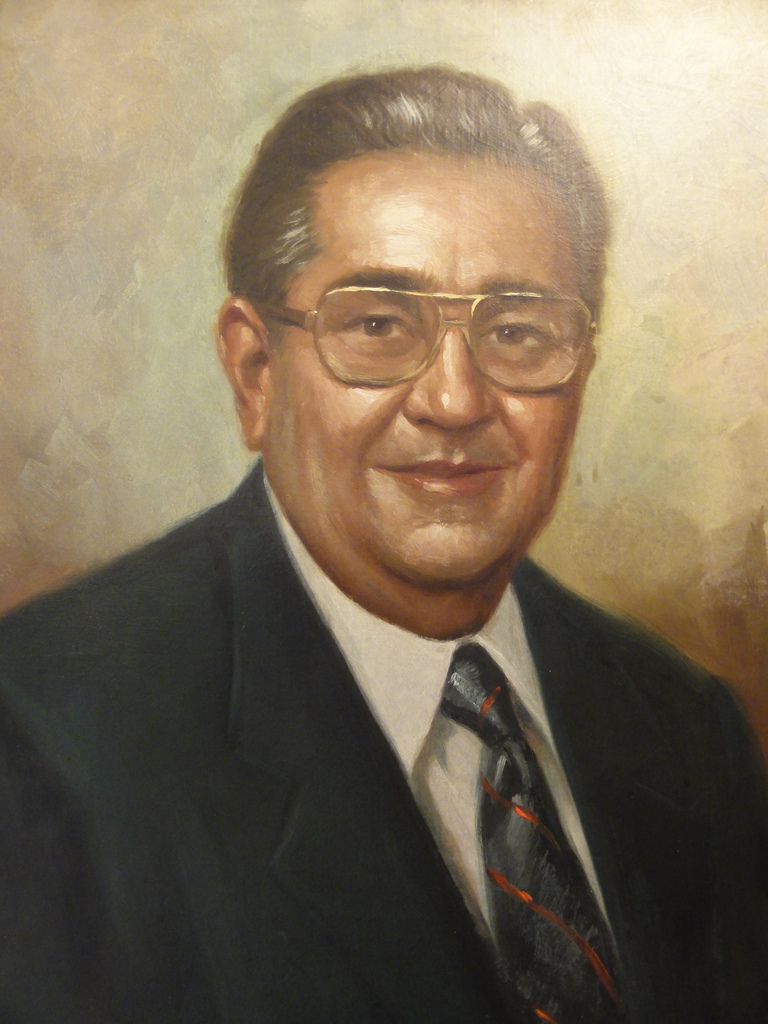
- Mayor José G. Tormos Vega

129th Mayor of Ponce, Puerto Rico
- In office 2 January 1977 – 22 February 1984
- Preceded by: Luis A. Morales
- Succeeded by: José Dapena Thompson

Personal details
- Born: 23 February 1925 Ponce, Puerto Rico
- Died: 17 August 1993 (aged 68) Florida, U.S.
- Party: New Progressive Party
- Spouse: Irding Chardón
- Profession: Politician

José Guillermo Tormos Vega (23 February 1925 – 17 August 1993), known as Joselín, was a Puerto Rican politician who served as Mayor of Ponce, Puerto Rico from 2 January 1977 to 22 February 1984. Tormos Vega is credited with establishing, during his term as mayor, Centro Ceremonial Indígena de Tibes as a museum.

== Early life ==
José Guillermo Tormos Vega was born in Ponce, Puerto Rico on 23 February 1925.

== Elections ==
In the November 1976 elections, Tormos Vega defeated the incumbent mayor, Luis A. Morales, by more than 3,000 votes. He was re-elected in 1980.

== Mayoral term ==
Among the public works projects that took place in the city during his tenure are the construction of the Cruceta El Vigía, the renovation of City Hall, and the Coto Laurel village square. He is also credited with establishing, during his term as mayor, Centro Ceremonial Indígena de Tibes as a museum.

In 1983, Tormos Vega honored long-time local legend Carlos Garay Villamil for his contributions to the traditions of the city of Ponce in his capacity as a horse-drawn carriage coachman. A plaque has since been added to the front facade of the Ponce City Hall to commemorate the event.

== Charged with extortion ==
Tormos Vega quit his position in 1984 upon being charged with extortion. He was replaced by José Dapena Thompson who, two and a half years later and in the midst of a hotly debated electoral campaign was forced to resign allegedly to dodge potential criminal prosecution for corruption. Tormos Vega died in jail a few years later, on 17 August 1993, at the age of 68.

== See also ==
- List of Puerto Ricans

Political offices
Preceded by Luis A. Morales	Mayor of Ponce, Puerto Rico; 1976–1984	Succeeded by José Dapena Thompson
