= Rafael Pujals =

Puerto Rican physician and civic leader in Ponce, PR

Dr. Rafael Pujals
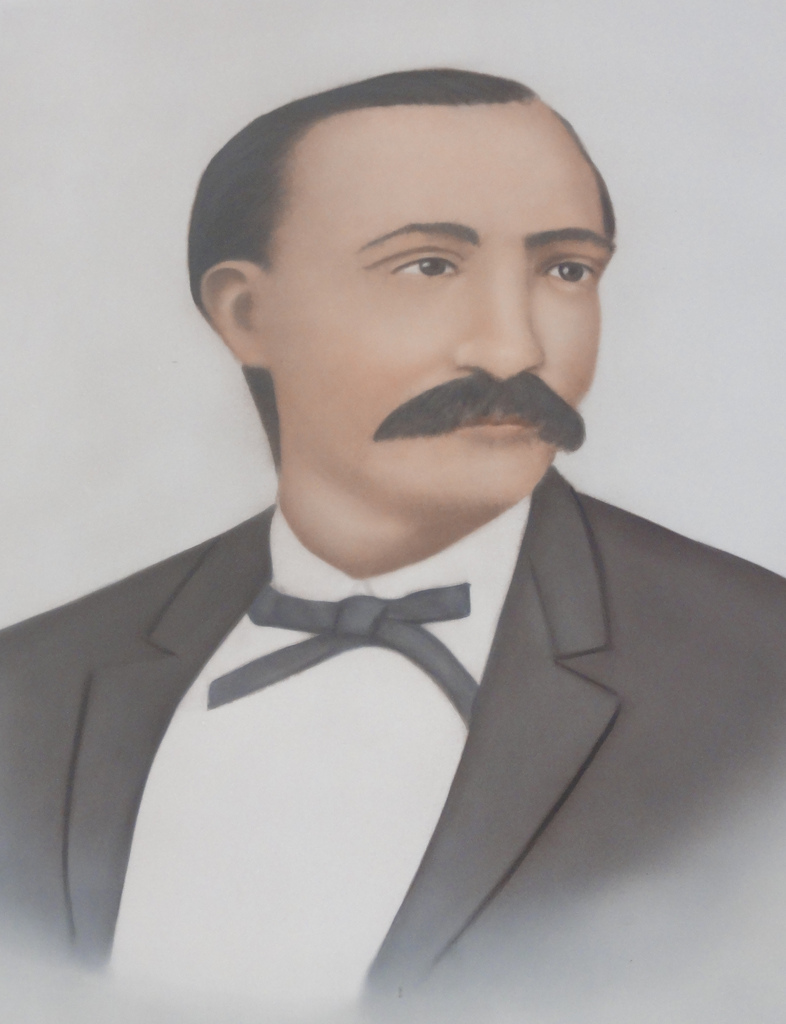
- Dr. Rafael Pujals around 1870
- Born: ca. 1830; Humacao, Puerto Rico
- Died: 23 April 1889; Ponce, Puerto Rico
- Education: University of Barcelona (MD)
- Years active: ca. 1860(?) - 1889
- Known for: First physician with a medical degree title in Ponce; First M.D. on the staff at Hospital de Damas; First medical director, Hospital Tricoche; Civic leader Physician for Ponce Municipal Fire Corps
- Medical career
- Profession: Physician
- Institutions: Hospital Damas; Hospital Tricoche

Rafael Pujals Cárdenas (ca. 1830 – 23 April 1889) was a late 19th-century Puerto Rican mwdical doctor practicing in Ponce, Puerto Rico, that excelled as a civic leader.

== Physician ==
Pujals Cárdenas was born in Humacao, Puerto Rico, (Note: There is disagreement as to where Pujals was born. Whereas Salvador Arana Soto states Pujals was born in St. Thomas, U.S.V.I. (See Arana Sotos's Catalogo de medicos de Puerto Rico, p.344) Eduardo Neumann Gandia states he was born in Humacao, Puerto Rico (See Neumann Gandia's Benefactores y Hombres Notables de Puerto Rico, pp.215-220.)) and graduated from the University of Barcelona, Spain. He was the first physician with a medical degree title in Ponce, becoming the first medical doctor on the staff at Hospital de Damas, where he worked without pay. He later became the first medical director of Hospital Tricoche.

In addition to his private medical practice, Dr. Pujals was also the physician for the famed Ponce Municipal Fire Corps in the last quarter of the 19th century.

== Civic leader ==
Pujals also excelled as a civic leader and on 30 June 1877, he became the first director of the reorganized Gabinete Ponceño de Lectura (Ponce Reading Cabinet), an early version of today's Ponce Public Library. In 1886, he was also one of the nine cosigners of El Plan de Ponce that Roman Baldorioty de Castro had championed seeking greater political autonomy for Puerto Rico. He was also an active participant at the Grito de Lares.

== Death ==
Pujals died in Ponce on 23 April 1889, victim of an asystole. He was interred at Panteón Nacional Román Baldorioty de Castro in Ponce.

== Legacy ==
The government of Puerto Rico honored Dr. Pujals naming a school in Ponce after him. He is also recognized for his contributions in civic duty at the Ponce Park for the Illustrious Ponce Citizens.

== See also ==
- Ponce, Puerto Rico
- List of Puerto Ricans
