= Ponce Servicios =

Municipal building in Ponce, Puerto Rico

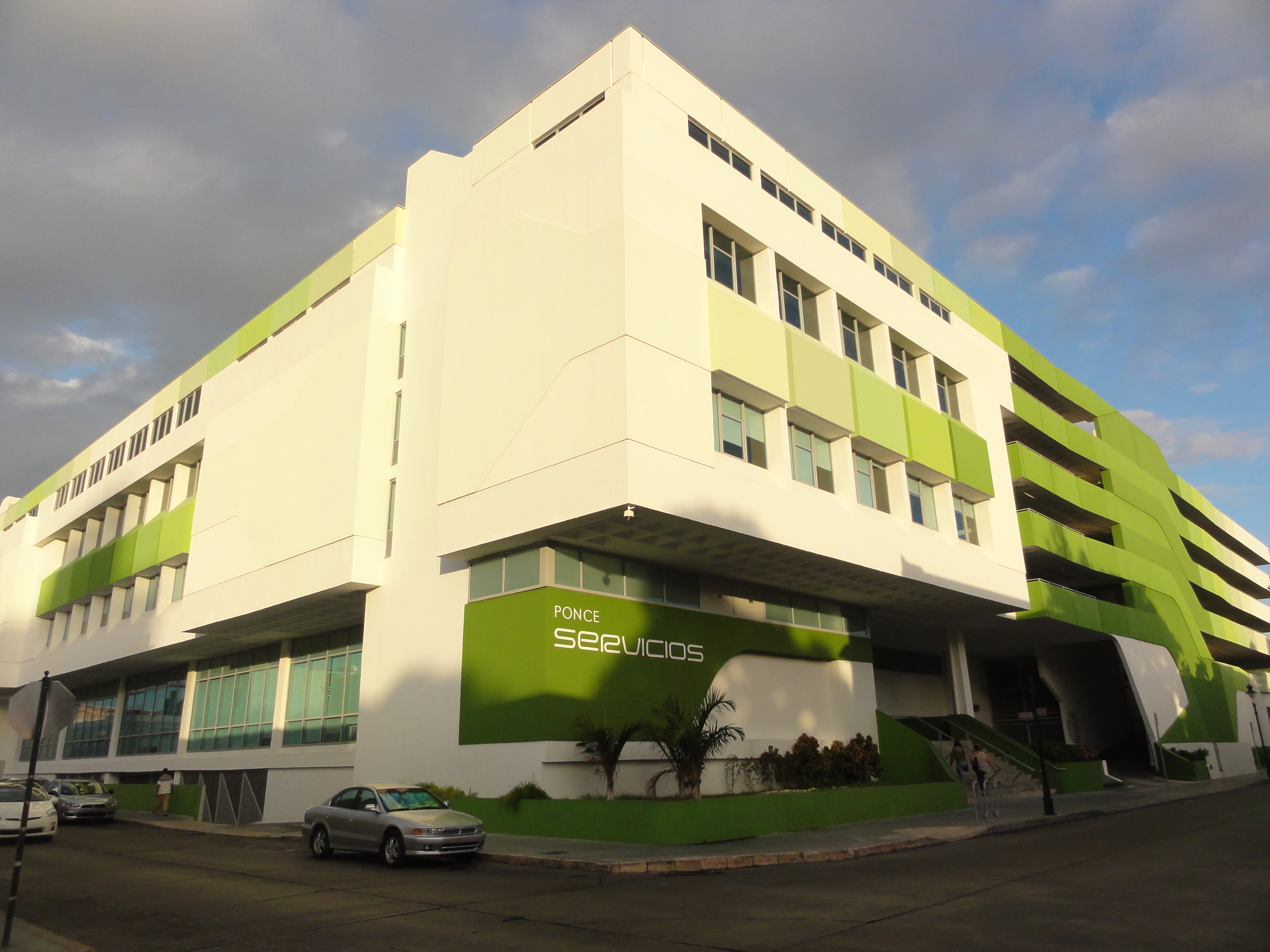
- Ponce Servicios, in Ponce, Puerto Rico, looking Northwest
- Interactive map of the Ponce Servicios area

General information
- Status: In Service - In Use
- Type: Originally, marketplace; Today, government offices
- Architectural style: Brutalist
- Location: Ponce, Puerto Rico
- Coordinates: 18°0′56.952″N 66°36′43.632″W
- Construction started: 1980
- Completed: 1981
- Opening: 1981
- Renovated: 2007
- Cost: $10,000,000 ($35.4 million in 2025 dollars)
- Owner: Government of the municipality of Ponce

Height
- Architectural: 60 ft (18.3 m)

Technical details
- Floor area: approx 200,000 sq ft (18,581 m^{2})
- Lifts/elevators: 5

Design and construction
- Architect: Octavio Rodríguez Jr. (1975)
- Developer: Government of Puerto Rico

Ponce Servicos, formerly Plaza del Mercado Juan Bigas, is a brutalist municipal building located Ponce, Puerto Rico. It is the largest building in the municipality in terms of footprint area and the only one that occupies an entire city block. The structure was built in 1981 as a way to provide a modern, air-conditioned, structure for the merchants and shoppers of the historic but aging Plaza de Mercado Isabel II building, while the latter underwent restoration. On its opening day it was named Plaza del Mercado Juan Bigas, in honor of Juan Bigas Moulins, the Ponce businessman by that name.

Upon its opening, some of the former fruits-and-vegetables merchants from the old Plaza del Mercado Isabel II building moved in, but many did not. Objections ranged from rent being too high to not providing the friendly atmosphere of the old Isabel II building provided because many perceived this brutalist architecture building as one that did not carry on the important city historic values conveyed by the old Art Deco Plaza del Mercado Isabel II building. In spite of these objections, the new building was used as a fruits-and-vegetables farm market plaza for 26 years, until 2007, when the restoration of the older Isabel II building was completed. On that year (2007), Plaza del Mercado Juan Bigas building was vacated, and merchants moved back to restored Plaza del Mercado Isabel II building, and the building came to be known simply as the Juan Bigas Building.

The Juan Bigas building then sat unused for three years, until 2010. In that year, after negotiations between the central and municipal governments, the Government of Puerto Rico transferred the structure to the Ponce Municipal Government. The Ponce municipal government reconditioned the building, now no longer called Plaza del Mercado Juan Bigas, but simply Edificio Juan Bigas (Juan Bigas Building) for use as office space for several municipal agencies. In October 2013, the Ponce Municipal Government reopened the building as a multi-agency municipal building offering a mix of municipal services to its residents and christened it "Ponce Servicios" (Ponce Services).

== Location ==
The structure is located at the grid formed by the Guadalupe, Salud, Estrella and Mayor streets. Its coordinates are N 18.01582 W 66.61212. The now-defunct Teatro Apolo was located at this spot, on the west side of Calle Salud, between C. Guadalupe and C. Estrella.

== History ==
The history of the, now, Ponce Servicios building can be divided broadly into two epochs, the years it served as Ponce's fruits-and vegetables market for area farmers, and the years it has served as a municipal government office building.

=== The Juan Bigas epoch ===
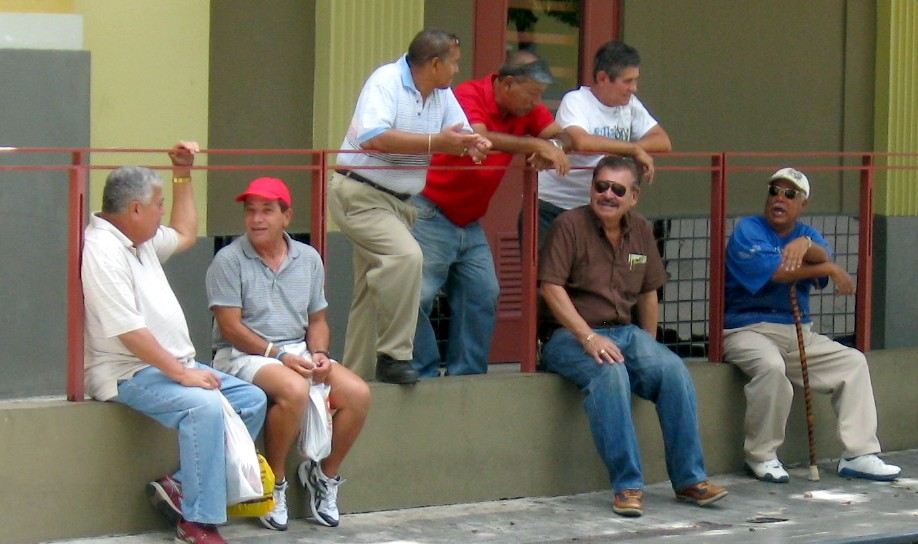
A group of men chatting outside the Ponce Servicios building

From 1863 to 1981, the Ponce city market ("Plaza del Mercado") operated at the Plaza del Mercado Isabel II building. Due to deterioration of that 1863 structure, a new structure was built to house the area farmers' market needs. In 1981, a new structure was built two blocks east of the Isabel II building and was named Plaza del Mercado Juan Bigas. The new building was located at the grid formed by the Guadalupe, Salud, Estrella and Mayor streets. The city market operated farmers' fruits-and-vegetable businesses from the new Juan Bigas. This new building was used as the Ponce city market for 26 years (until 2007), but its potential was never fully realized and its spaced was never fully occupied during this period. The new building, originally known simply as "Plaza del Mercado de Ponce" was renamed "Plaza del Mercado Juan Bigas" to differentiate fully from the old "Plaza del Mercado [de Ponce]" building whose name had gotten so entrenched in townspeople's minds during its 118 years of operation. Inaugurated in 1981, the purpose of the new building was to replace the aging, but historic, Plaza del Mercado Isabel II building.

Meanwhile, the Plaza del Mercado Isabel II building was restored starting in 1980 -including the addition of air conditioning for the first time- and reopened in 1989. Its new tenants, however, were not the former fruits-and-vegetables market tenants, but tenants such as the Puerto Rican department store Pitusa, who opened a store there in 1984 when a section of the building they were to occupy was already complete. While the Juan Bigas building continued to host fruits-and-vegetables tenants, the Isabel II structure came to host the Pitusa department store plus various handcrafts shops. After the 23 years (1984-2007) that the two buildings operated concurrently, Pitusa left the Isabel II location, their former space was remodeled and, in August 2007, the Juan Bigas building shopkeepers moved back to the historic Isabel II building leaving the Juan Bigas building unoccupied.

Being not a municipal property but a state property, on June 28, 2010, Governor Luis Fortuño signed Senate Resolution 191, transferring ownership of the Plaza del Mercado de Ponce Juan Bigas building to the Ponce Municipal Government.

=== The municipal services epoch ===
On 7 April 2011, the municipal government announced it would invest $10 million to remodel the Juan Bigas building and turn it into a municipal services center, dubbed "Ponce Servicios", hosting various municipal services offices. The remodeling of the old Juan Bigas building to be used for municipal government services was to occur at a cost of $6.828 million. A 27 July 2011 news report stated work on the Juan Bigas building would commence in October 2011 at an expected cost of $15 million.

A 26 June 2013 news clip reported that renovations had been completed and the first two floors of the facility were to open by the end of July 2013. The agencies scheduled to occupy the structure were listed as: the Oficina de Permisos (Office of Permits), Ordenación Territorial (Office of Territorial Planning), Vivienda Municipal (Office of Municipal Housing), the Archivo Histórico de Ponce, Office of the Federal Ryan White Program and the Banco Municipal (Municipal Bank). The facility was to be named "Ponce Servicios". The building reopened in August 2013 as "Ponce Servicios", hosting various municipal dependencies.

== Cost and size ==
The building is 5 stories high and cost $10 million to build. It is the building with the largest footprint in Ponce. The building sustained damaged during the 2020 Puerto Rico earthquake.

== See also ==
- Archivo Historico de Ponce
