= Luis A. Morales =

Puerto Rican politician (1928–2011)

Luis A. "Wito" Morales
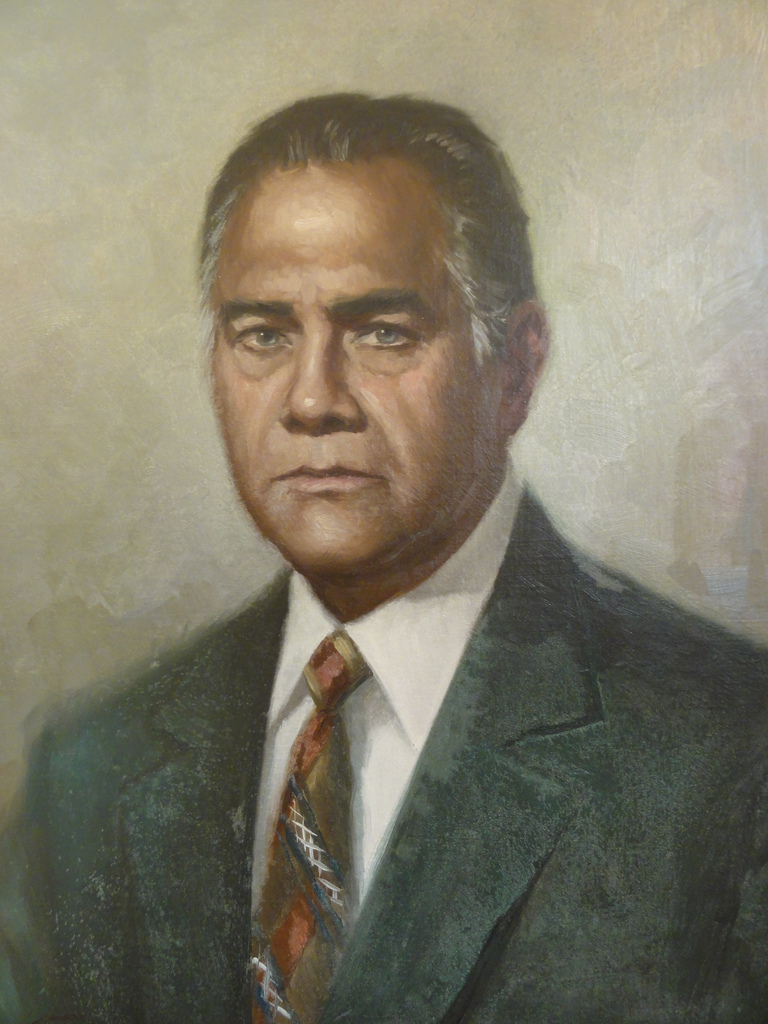
- Mayor Luis A. "Wito" Morales Crespo

128th Mayor of Ponce, Puerto Rico
- In office 1973–1976
- Preceded by: Juan H. Cintrón García
- Succeeded by: José G. Tormos Vega

Personal details
- Born: 7 January 1928 Ponce, Puerto Rico
- Died: 18 June 2011 (aged 83) Ponce, Puerto Rico
- Party: Popular Democratic Party of Puerto Rico
- Occupation: Broadcaster, sportsman
- Profession: Radio personality

Luis Antonio ("Wito") Morales Crespo (7 January 1928 – 18 June 2011) was a Puerto Rican politician and Mayor of Ponce, Puerto Rico, from 1973 to 1976. He was also Senator for the District of Ponce from 1977 to 1980 and president of the Ponce Municipal Assembly from 1989 to 2004 He is recognized as a politician, sportsman, and sports broadcaster.

== Radio personality ==
Before entering politics, Morales Crespo was a prominent local radio personality and broadcaster. He played for the Leones de Ponce professional baseball team from 1947 to 1953 and is an exalted member of Ponce's Sports Hall of Fame, cited at the Francisco Pancho Coimbre Museum.

== Business endeavors ==
Starting in 1980 he became General Manager of WOLE-TV Channel 12 Aguadilla-Mayagüez.

== Mayoral works ==
The administration of mayor Morales Crespo was characterized mostly by the rebuilding of the infrastructure of the city. The most prominent public works during the administration of mayor Morales Crespo are the building of the new farmers market (Nueva Plaza del Mercado, or Plaza de Mercado Juan Bigas) located at the grid formed by the Guadalupe, Salud, Estrella and Mayor streets; the building of levee systems for Rio Portugues and Rio Bucana; the modernization of the sewerage system in Barrio La Playa; and the building of the Municipal Public Works Operations Center in the El Tuque sector of Barrio Canas.

== Death and legacy ==
Morales Crespo died at Hospital Damas, in Ponce, Puerto Rico, on 18 June 2011. Governor Luis Fortuño declared three days of mourning island-wide accompanied by the lowering of the U.S. and Puerto Rico flags at all public buildings and facilities in memory of Morales Crespo. Ponce Mayor Mayita Melendez also declared three days of mourning and ordered all municipal flags in public buildings at half staff.

== Honors ==
In Ponce there is a park at the Cerrillos Lake and Dam area named after him. Morales is also honored at Ponce's Park of Illustrious Ponce Citizens. Only six, of over 100 Ponce mayors, are honored there.

== See also ==
- Ponce, Puerto Rico
- List of Puerto Ricans
- List of mayors of Ponce, Puerto Rico

Political offices
Preceded by Juan H. Cintrón García	Mayor of Ponce, Puerto Rico; 1972–1976	Succeeded by José G. Tormos Vega
