= List of tourist attractions in Ponce, Puerto Rico =

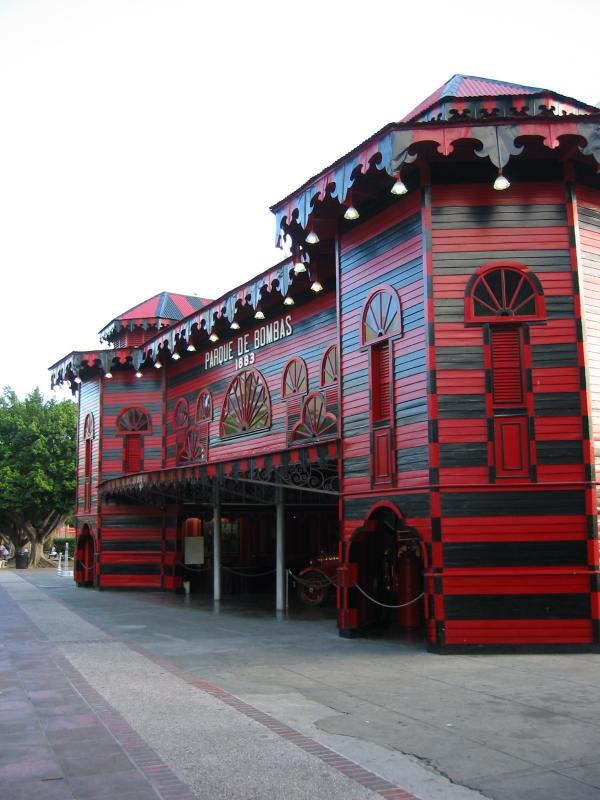
Parque de Bombas, built in 1882, is one of Puerto Rico's most photographed structures

Ponce, Puerto Rico's second-largest city outside the San Juan metropolitan area, receives over 100,000 visitors annually.

Ponce's sights include monuments and architecture, such as its Monumento a la Abolición de la Esclavitud and Residencia Armstrong-Poventud, and pink marble curbs and chamfered streets corners, as well as historic houses, castles and concert halls. There are also more modern attractions such as its seafront Tablado La Guancha as well as attractions that date back some 1500 years, like the Tibes Indigenous Ceremonial Center. The city has been called "the most Puerto Rican city in Puerto Rico."

== Within the city's urban area ==
=== Within the Ponce Historic Zone ===
==== Museums ====
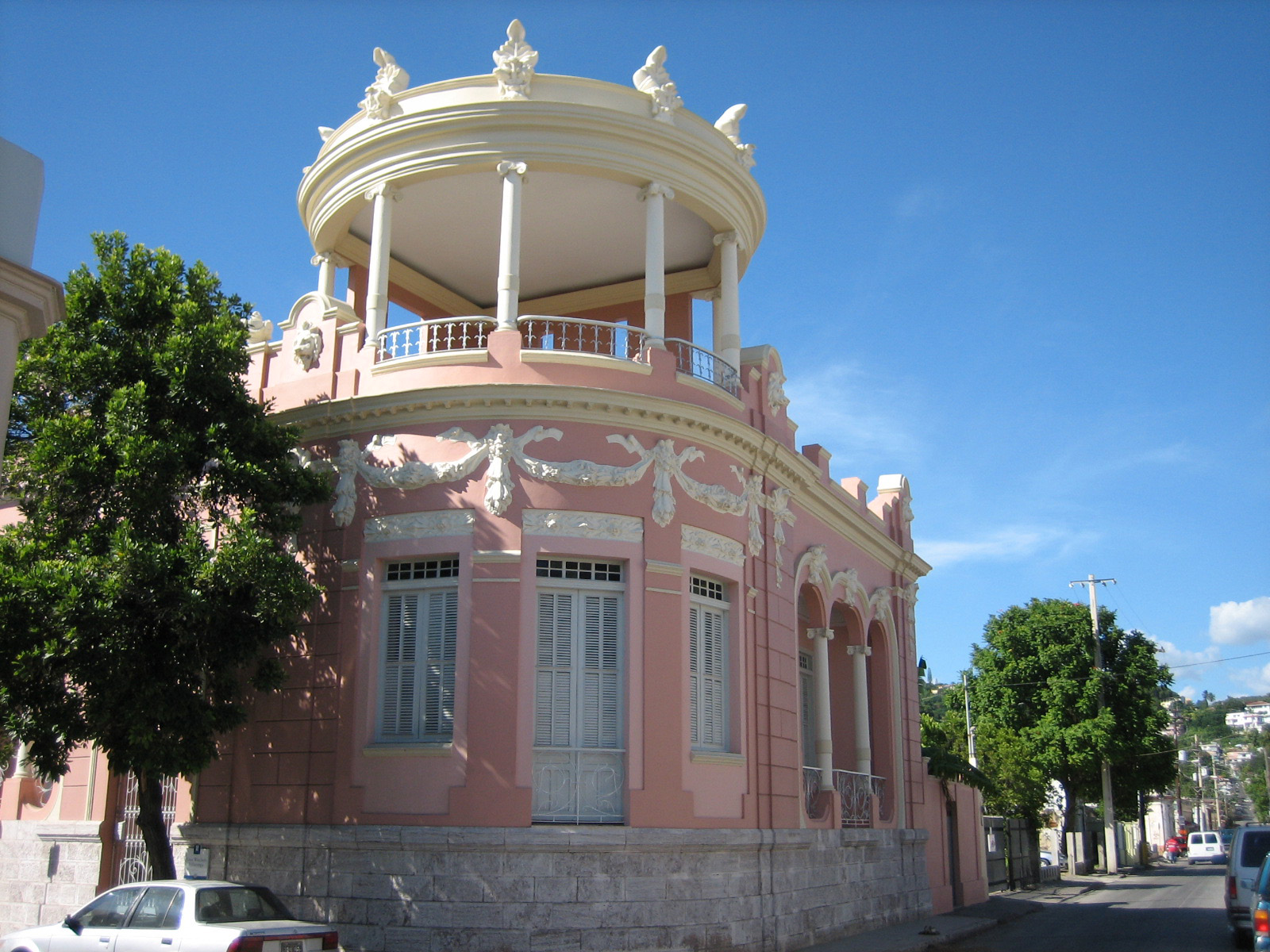
Museo de la Arquitectura Ponceña, built in Classical revival style by Alfredo B. Wiechers, opened in 1996

- Museo Parque de Bombas
- Museo Francisco "Pancho" Coimbre
- Museo de la Historia de Ponce
- Museo de Arte de Ponce
- Museo de la Arquitectura Ponceña
- Museo de la Música Puertorriqueña
- Museo de la Masacre de Ponce
- Museo del Autonomismo Puertorriqueño
- Museo Casa Paoli

==== Parks ====
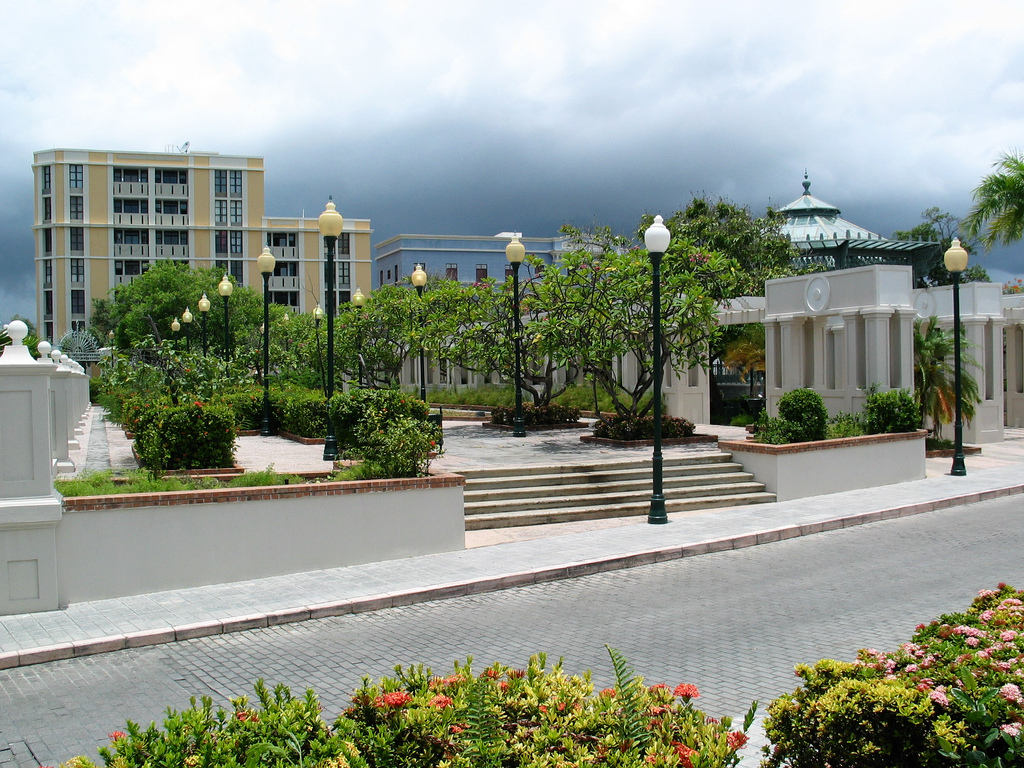
Parque Urbano Dora Colon Clavell located 2 blocks from Plaza Las Delicias

- Plaza Las Delicias
- Plaza Degetau
- Plaza Muñoz Rivera
- Parque de la Ceiba
- Parque Lineal Veredas del Labrador
- Parque Urbano Dora Colón Clavell
- Parque del Tricentenario
- Parque de la Abolición
- Parque Ecológico Urbano

==== Monuments ====
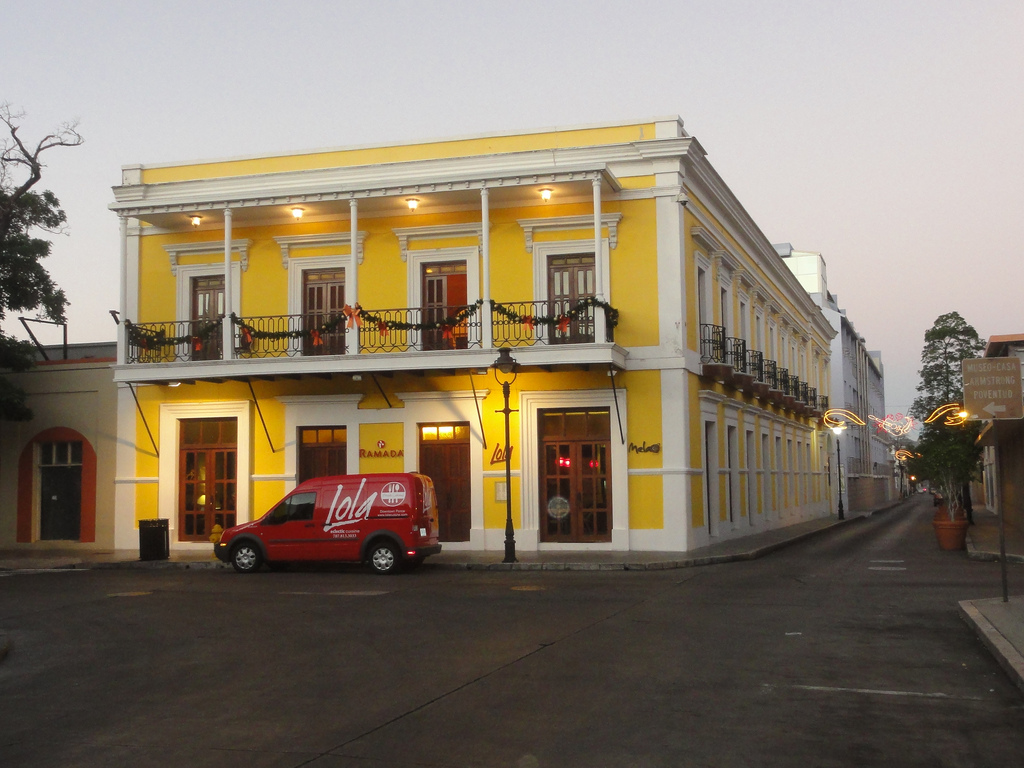
Casa Saurí, today a protected section of a hotel, was built in 1882

- Monumento a la abolición de la esclavitud
- Monumento a los heroes de El Polvorín (obelisk)

==== Historic houses ====
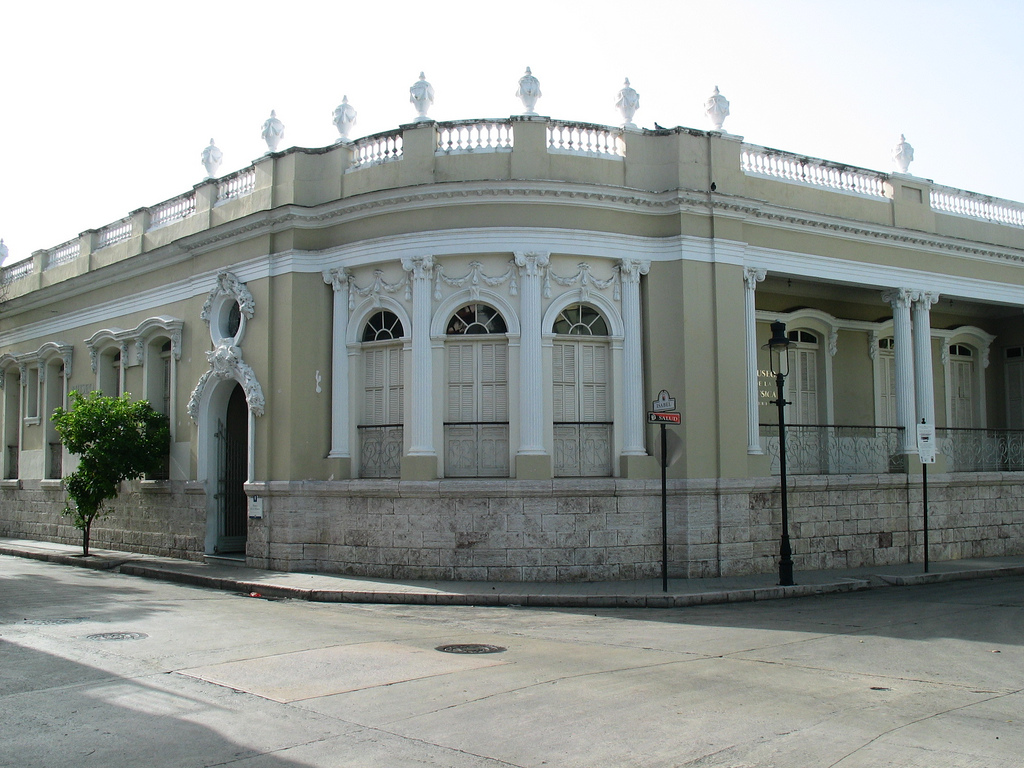
Casa Serrallés, built in 1911, was the downtown residence of the Serrallés family as opposed to their 1935 hilltop castle-residence.

- Casa Vives (1860)
- Casa Paoli (1864)
- Residencia Ermelindo Salazar (1870)
- Casa Saurí (1882)
- Casa Rosaly–Batiz (1897)
- Residencia Armstrong-Poventud (1899)
- Residencia Subirá (1910)
- Casa Salazar-Candal (1911)
- Centro Español de Ponce (1911)
- Casa Serrallés (1911)
- Casa Wiechers-Villaronga (1912)
- Casa Oppenheimer (1913)
- Casa Rosita Serrallés (1926)

==== Churches ====
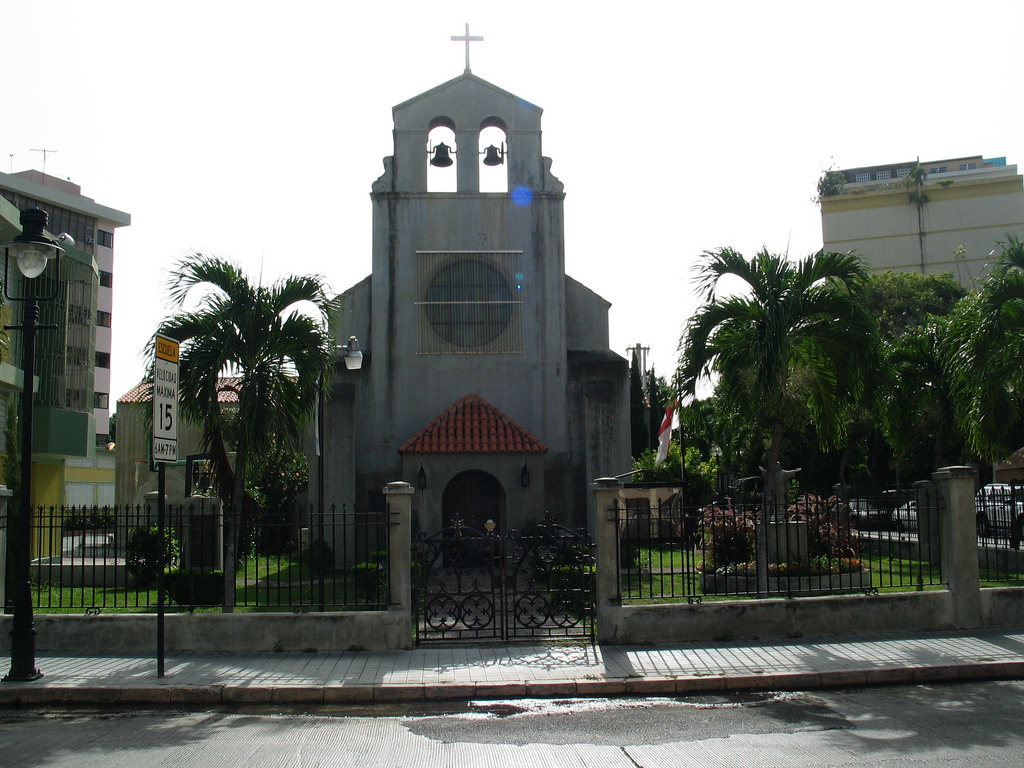
Iglesia de la Santísima Trinidad, the first Protestant church in Latin America, built in 1873

- Catedral Nuestra Señora de Guadalupe - located at Plaza Las Delicias
- Iglesia de la Santísima Trinidad - first Protestant church in Latin America (1873)
- Primera Iglesia Metodista Unida de Ponce
- Iglesia Metodista Unida de la Playa de Ponce

==== Historic commercial institutions ====
- Hotel Meliá (1895)
- Ponce Plaza Hotel & Casino (1882)
- Banco Crédito y Ahorro Ponceño (1924)
- Banco de Ponce (1924)

==== 20th and 21st century architecture ====
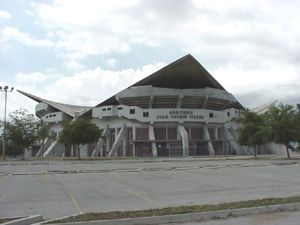
Auditorio Juan Pachín Vicéns, home venue for Leones de Ponce, sits 16,000 people

- Coliseo Pachin Vicens (1972)
- Universidad Catolica de Puerto Rico (1948)
- La Guancha (1990)
- Concha Acústica de Ponce (1956) - one of the venues for Banda Municipal de Ponce
- Complejo Ferial de Puerto Rico (2012)

==== Theaters ====
- Teatro La Perla (1864)
- Teatro Fox Delicias
- Concha Acústica de Ponce

==== Shopping ====
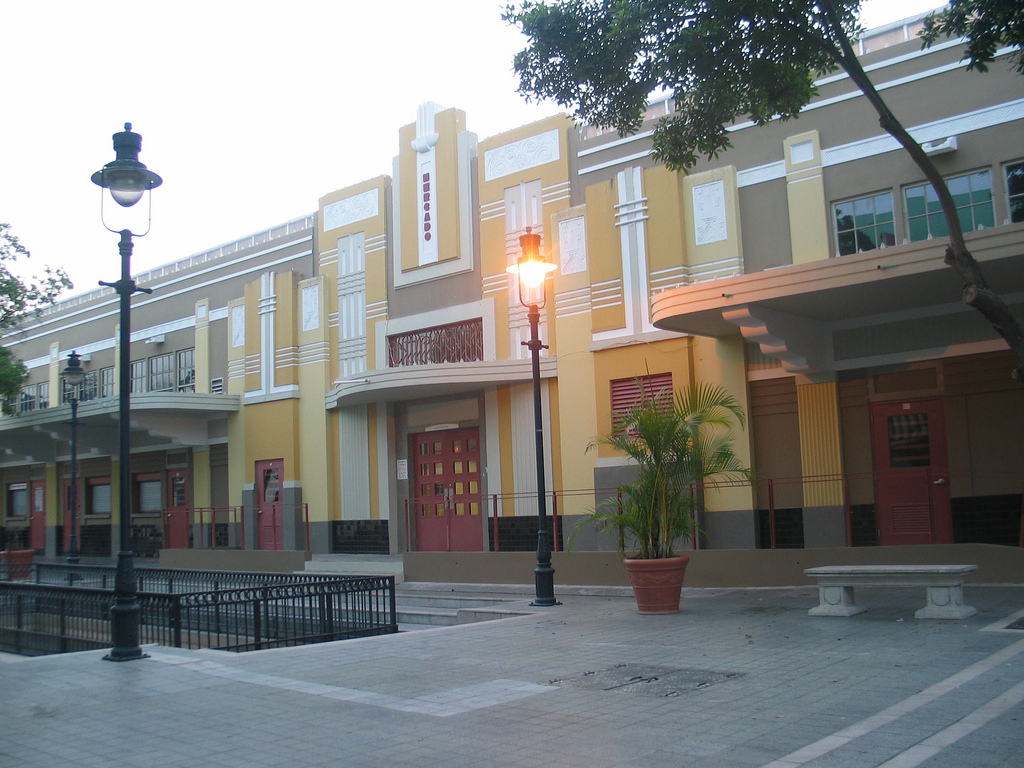
Plaza de Mercado Isabel Segunda farmer's market was built in 1863

- Paseo Atocha - charming 20th century shopping experience
- Los Chinos de Ponce - ice cream parlor over 50 years old
- Fox Delicias Mall - historic theater-turned-shopping mall (now closed)
- Plaza de Mercado de Ponce - historic farmer's market marketplace
- Mercado de las Carnes - aka, Plaza Juan Ponce de León

==== Cultural institutions ====
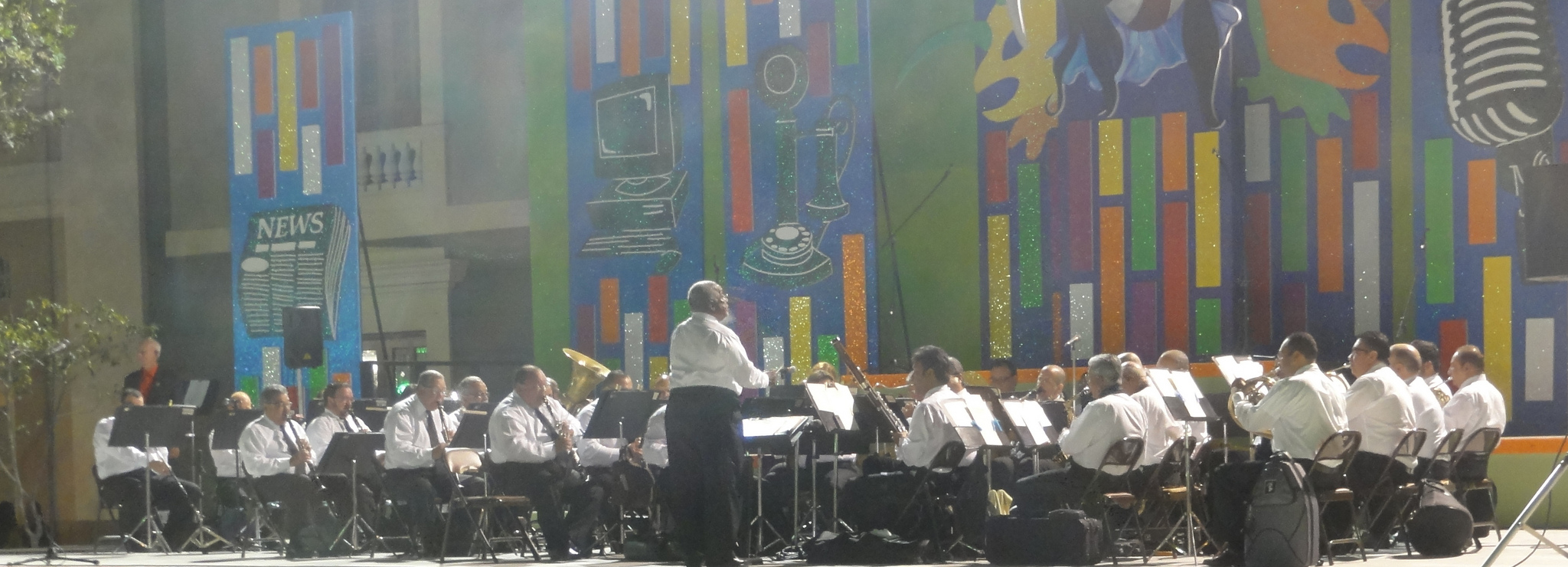
The ultra-centenarian Banda Municipal de Ponce plays free "retreta" concerts every Sunday evening at public places in the city

- Centro Cultural de Ponce Carmen Sola de Pereira
- Biblioteca Municipal de Ponce - at Boulevard Mguel Pou
- Banda Municipal de Ponce, located at Centro Integrado para el Fortalecimiento de las Artes Musicales (1864)
- Antiguo Casino de Ponce

==== Festivals and events ====
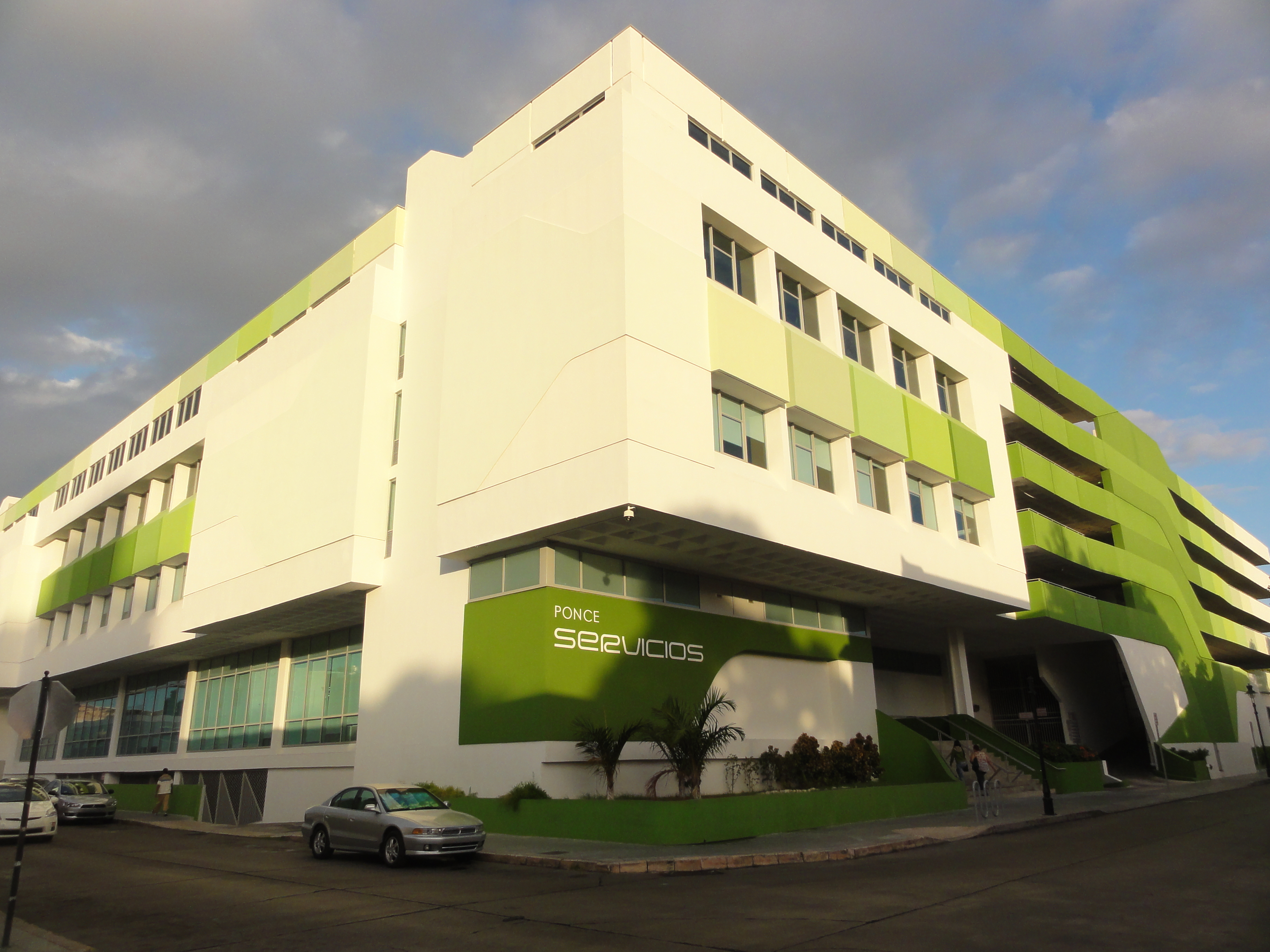
Ponce Servicios, brutalist building occupies an entire city block

- Carnaval de Ponce
- Día Mundial de Ponce
- Feria de Artesanías de Ponce
- Festival Nacional de la Quenepa
- Las Mañanitas
- Fiesta Nacional de la Danza
- Ponce Jazz Festival
- Ponce Marathon
- Cruce a Nado Internacional

==== Others ====
- Campo Atlético Charles H. Terry
- Albergue Caritativo Tricoche
- Antiguo Cuartel Militar Español de Ponce
- Antiguo Hospital Militar Español de Ponce
- Ponce Servicios - building with the largest footprint in the city
- Casa Alcaldía de Ponce (1840)

=== Outside the Ponce Historic Zone ===
==== Museums ====
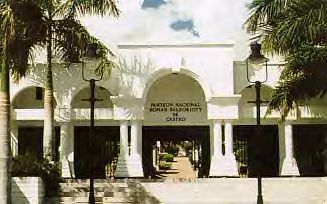
Panteón Nacional Román Baldorioty de Castro (1842), an inactive burial grounds, final resting place of many illustrious citizens

- Museo de Arte de Ponce
- Museo Castillo Serrallés

==== Cemeteries ====
- Cementerio Civil de Ponce – burial site for Hector Lavoe and many other prominent Puerto Ricans
- Cementerio Católico San Vicente de Paul - NRHP#88001249
- Panteón Nacional Román Baldorioty de Castro (1842) - the burial site of many illustrious citizens

==== Historic homes ====
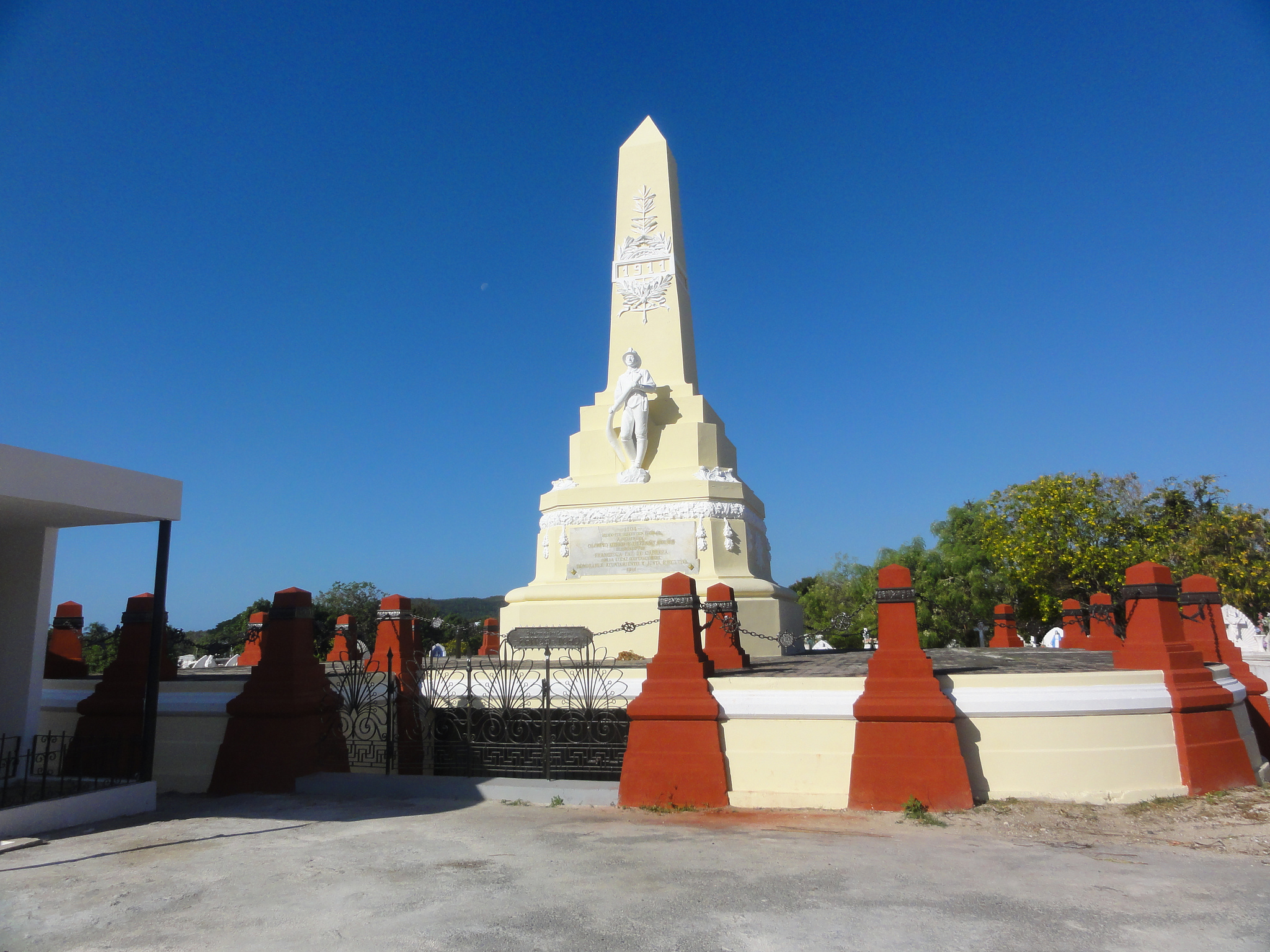
Monument to the Heroes of El Polvorín Fire (1911), mausoleum and final resting place for Ponce's bravest

- Castillo Serrallés (1930) - HRHP# 80004494, a "castle" built by Pedro Adolfo de Castro for rum baron Juan Eugenio Serrallés
- Casa Fernando Luis Toro (1927) - NRHP# 86000421

==== Others ====
- Monumento a los heroes de El Polvorín (tomb) (1911) - to the seven men that saved the city from a devastating fire in 1899
- Cruceta del Vigía - lookout for panoramic views of the city and Caribbean Sea, located next to Museo Castillo Serrallés
- Ponce YMCA - NRHP# 12000331
- Calle 25 de Enero - historic Victorian village, home to Ponce firefighters and their families
- Iglesia Metodista Unida de la Playa de Ponce - NRHP #08000283
- Plaza del Caribe
- Centro del Sur Mall
- Grand Prix de Ponce - speedway
- Villa Pesquera - fishing village
- Club Náutico de Ponce - private sports complex, viewable from the La Guancha Boardwalk
- Complejo Ferial de Puerto Rico - convention center

== Outside the city's urban area ==
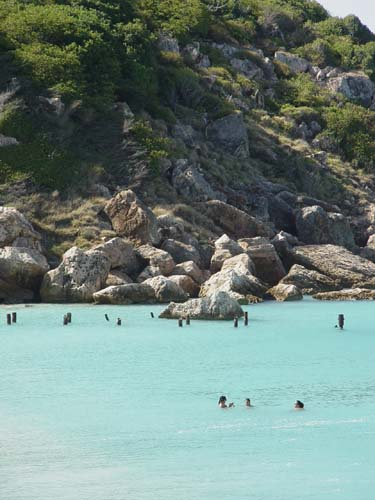
Playa Pelícano Beach, a Blue Flag beach at Caja de Muertos, Nature Reserve

=== Beaches ===
- Playa Pelícano Beach - a Blue Flag beach
- El Tuque Beach
- La Guancha Beach

=== Mountains ===
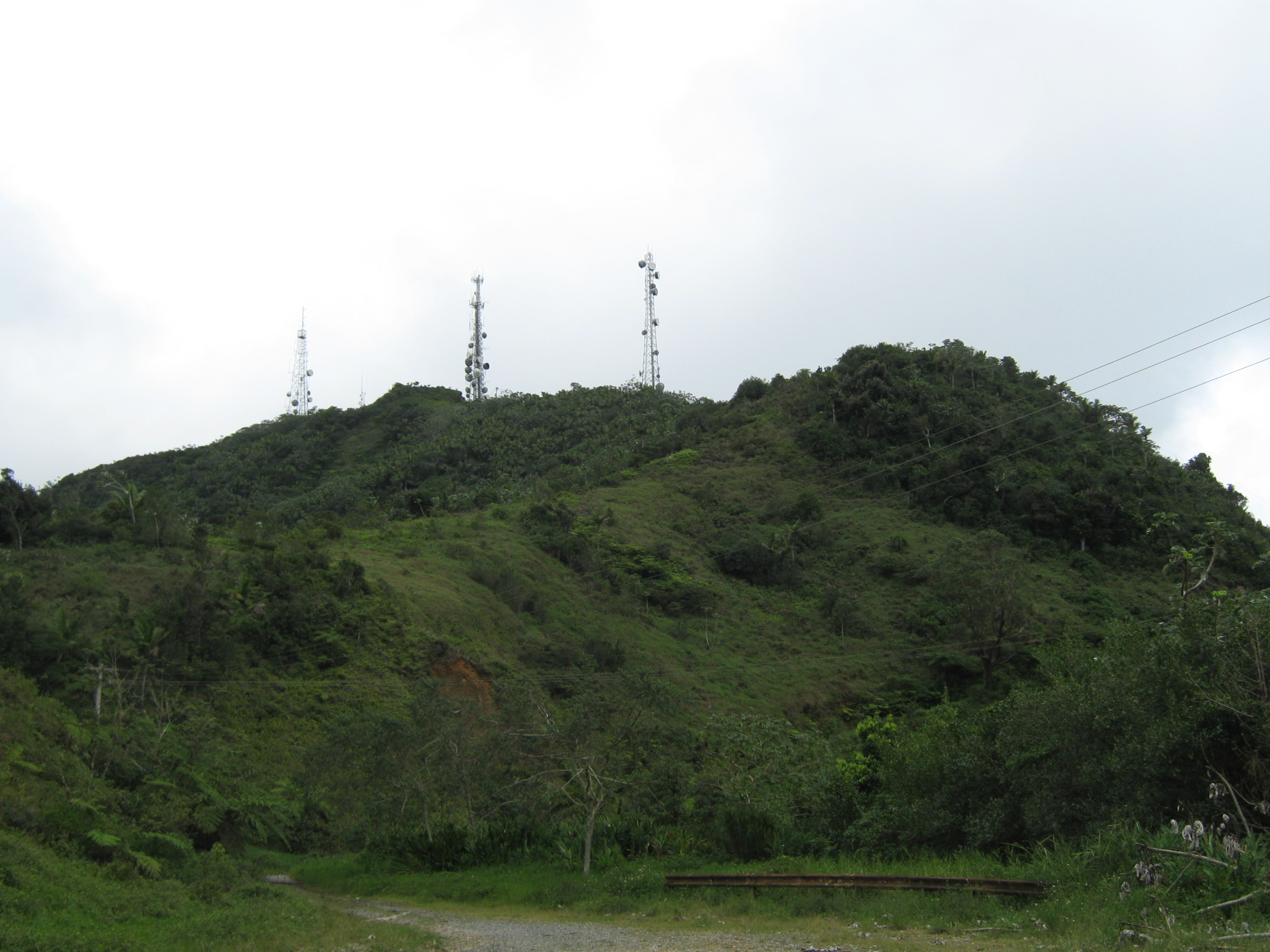
Cerro de Punta, in Ponce's Barrio Anon is Puerto Rico's tallest peak at 4,390 ft

- Cerro Punta - It is Puerto Rico's tallest, and both northern and southern coasts of the island can be seen on clear days
- Monte Jayuya - Puerto Rico's second tallest peak
- Cerro Maravilla - Known as El Cerro de los Mártires, it is the annual gathering point for independence activists
- Cerro del Vigía - Home to Cruceta del Vigía, Museo Castillo Serrallés, and (now closed) Hotel Ponce Intercontinental

=== Parks, forests and recreational areas ===
- Caja de Muertos
- Parque Luis A. "Wito" Morales
- Parque Ceremonial Indigena de Tibes
- Cerrillos State Forest
- Toro Negro State Forest
- Cerrillos Dam
- La Guancha Boardwalk
- Reserva Natural Punta Cucharas

=== Others ===
- Hacienda Buena Vista - 19th century coffee plantation
- Destileria Serralles - makers of Ron Don Q
- Portugues Dam

== See also ==
- List of barrios of Ponce, Puerto Rico
- Porta Caribe
- List of people from Ponce, Puerto Rico
- List of islands of Ponce, Puerto Rico
