= List of Puerto Rican architects =

This list includes people, both Puerto Rican and foreign, whose work has made a significant contribution to Puerto Rican architecture.

== List of Puerto Rican architects ==
Amaral, Jesús Eduardo, FAIA (1927, Humacao, PR)
Founder and first Director (1966–69) of the School of Architecture-University of Puerto Rico.
Fellow of the American Institute of Architects, Recipient of the Henry Klumb Award 1985.
Important works include Hotel Delicias, San Juan, PR (1960), Condominio Universitario, Condominio Costa Azul, Colegio Regional de Humacao.

Benítez Rexach, Félix
Important works include the Normandie Hotel

Bertoli Calderoni, Juan (1820-1885, Ponce, PR)
Important works include Teatro La Perla, Ponce, PR (1864), Casa Serrallés, Ponce, PR, Museo de la Música Puertorriqueña, Ponce, PR.

Cardona, Segundo, FAIA (1950-, San Juan, PR)
Important works include Coliseo de Puerto Rico in 2004.

Carmoega, Rafael (1894–1968)
Important works include the School of Tropical Medicine (Escuela de Medicina Tropical) San Juan, PR (1924), Mercado de las Carnes, Ponce, PR (1926), Capitolio de Puerto Rico, San Juan, PR (1929).

De Castro y Besosa, Pedro (1895–1936)
Important works include Castillo Serrallés, Ponce, PR (1930), Casa de España, San Juan, PR (1932), Villa Caparra, San Juan, PR (1929), Cuadrangulo UPR, San Juan, PR (1935).

Domenech, Manuel V. (Ponce, PR)
Important works include Rosaly-Batiz House, Ponce, PR (1897), Armstrong-Poventud Residence, Ponce, PR (1899), and Casa Paoli, Ponce, PR (1907 intervention).

Frade, Ramon, (1875–1954, Cayey, PR)

Fuentes, Maruja (1978–2010, Ponce, PR)

Luberza, Timoteo (c. 1820 - 1895, Ponce, PR)
Important works include Plaza de Mercado de Ponce, Ponce, PR (1863), and Acueducto de Ponce, Ponce, PR (1876).

Méndez Mercado, Pedro (1902–1990)
Important works include Edificio Miami, San Juan, PR (1936), Escuela Aguayo Aldea, Caguas, PR (1939), Plaza del Mercado de Ponce, Ponce, PR.

Mignucci, Andrés, FAIA (1957, Ponce, PR - 2022, San Juan, PR).
Henry Klumb Award
Fellow of the American Institute of Architects
Publications include Conversations with Form: A Workbook for Students of Architecture (Routledge, 2014), Arquitectura Contemporanea en Puerto Rico 1976-1992 (1992, 2011). and [Con]textos: el Parque Muñoz Rivera y el Tribunal Supremo de Puerto Rico (2012).

Nechodoma, Antonin (1887, Prague - 1928, San Juan)
Important works include Missionary Society of the Methodist Episcopal Church, Ponce, PR (1907), Casa Korber, San Juan, PR (1917), Casa Roig, Humacao, PR (1921), Mansion Georgetti, San Juan, PR (1923), Banco de Nova Scotia, San Juan, PR (1924).

Porrata Doria, Francisco (Ponce, PR)
Important works include Banco Credito y Ahorro Ponceño, Ponce, PR (1924), Banco de Ponce, Ponce, PR (1924), Castillo Mario Mercado, Guayanilla, PR (1930), Teatro Fox Delicias, Ponce, PR (1931).

Rigau, Jorge FAIA (1953, Arecibo, Puerto Rico)
Fellow of the American Institute of Architects, Recipient of the Henry Klumb Award 2006
Founder (1995) and First Dean of The New School of Architecture-Polytechnic University of Puerto Rico (1995–2006)
Publications include Puerto Rico 1900, Turn of the Century Architecture in the Hispanic Caribbean 1890-1930 (1992), and Havana (with Nancy Stout) (1994).

Silva Boucher, Blas (1869-1949, Ponce, PR)
Important works include Font-Ubides House, Ponce, PR (1913); Subira Residence, Ponce, PR (1910); and Salazar-Candal House, Ponce, PR (1911).

Wiechers, Alfredo (1881, Ponce; 1964, Barcelona)
Important works include Casa Villaronga, Ponce, PR (1911), Casa Serrallés, Ponce, PR (1911), Casa Oppenheimer, Ponce, PR (1913).
