= Architecture museum =

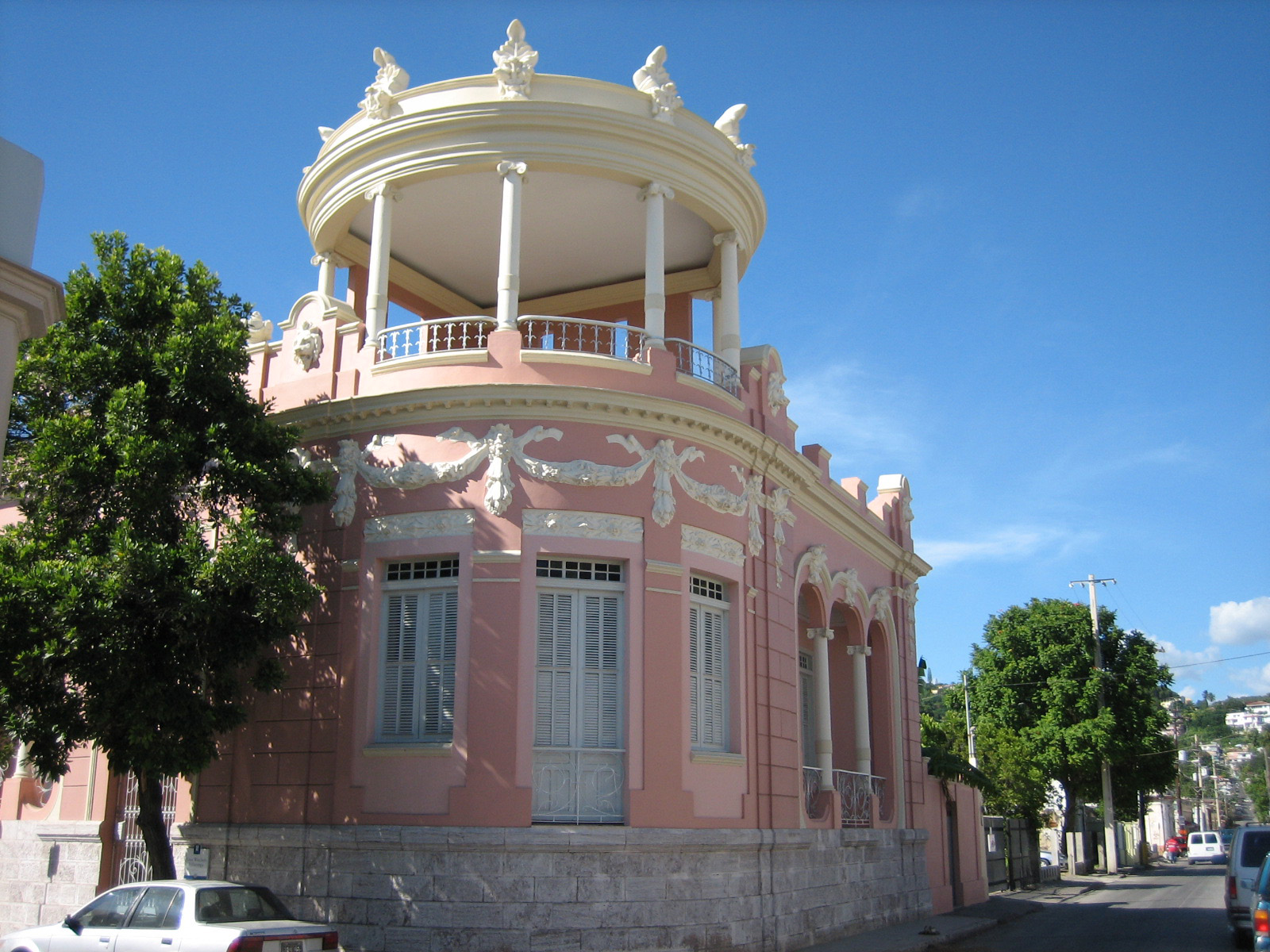
The Museum of Ponce Architecture, in Ponce, Puerto Rico, focuses on the Ponce Creole architectural style

An architecture museum is a museum dedicated to educating visitors about architecture in general or with a focus on a specific architectural style. Architecture museums may also educate visitors on the traditional history of architecture or art, which can provide useful context for many architecture exhibits. They are often chartered with the principle of advancing public education on how design can positively impact the human environment. Some architecture museums, such as the Chicago Athenaeum also educate visitors in a variety of other related fields, such as urban design, landscape design, interior design, and historic preservation.

The world's first museum dedicated solely to the discipline of architecture was Shchusev Museum of Architecture in Moscow in 1934, followed by the Museum of Finnish Architecture in 1956. Other museums are not entirely dedicated to architecture but do contain architecture sections (such as Museums of Metz in Metz, France), architecture halls (such as Chicago Athenaeum, in Chicago, Illinois, US), or architecture galleries (such as University of South Australia's Architecture Museum in Mount Gambier, South Australia).

The International Confederation of Architectural Museums is an international organization for architecture museums. Members consist of museums, centers, collections and other institutions that offer permanent exhibitions or dedicated galleries on architecture.

== Ownership, venues, size and exhibitions ==
As for ownership and operation, some architecture museums, such Galleri Rom, in Oslo, Norway, are privately owned. Others, like Museo Nacional de Arquitectura, in Mexico City, are a publicly owned national patrimony. Still others, like the National Building Museum, in Washington, D.C., are public institutions but privately operated.

In terms of the venues for these museums, some architecture museums are located in former houses, mansions, or residences, such as Museo de la Arquitectura Ponceña. Other museums, on the other hand, are housed in structures specifically designed to accommodate an architecture museum, such as the Canadian Centre for Architecture (CCA). The museum architecture in such architecture museums has been specifically designed and tailored to the purpose for that space. Architecture museums can also be "housed" in the open air, such as Japan's Meiji-mura. Overall, house-based architecture museums abound: other examples of house-based architecture museums are Schifferstadt, in Frederick, Maryland, Rietveld Schröder House, in Utrecht, Netherlands, and Lluís Domènech i Montaner House-Museum in Canet de Mar, Spain.

As for displays and exhibitions, architecture museums may display exhibitions relating the history of architecture of a certain region, such as German Architecture Museum (diachronic), but others, such as the Museum of Ponce Architecture focuses on a particular architectural style (Ponce Creole) - synchronic.

Some architecture museums are based in very large cities or large metropolitan areas, but the architecture museum itself may be quite small; one example of this is the Skyscraper Museum in New York City.

== Awards ==
The biennial International Highrise Award, is granted in Frankfurt am Main to the "a structure that combines exemplary sustainability, external shape and internal spatial quality, not to mention social aspects, to create a model design." The award was first given in 2003 and it was the brainchild of a partnership between the City of Frankfurt, the German Architecture Museum and DekaBank. The prize, a statuette and EUR 50,000 is awarded to the planners and developers jointly. The award consists of a statuette and EUR 50,000, which are awarded jointly to the planners and developers winning the award.

The American Society of Landscape Architects grants professional awards every year to architecture museums and art displays. Some of the award-winning projects have been: Perez Art Museum Miami, that won the award for Resiliency by Design, the Teardrop Park, winner in the General Design Category and Mesa Arts Center, a General Design Honor Award winner.

== See also ==
- Design museum
- Schifferstadt
- Ennigaldi-Nanna's museum
- International Council of Museums
- International Museum Day (18 May)
- List of museums
- .museum
- Museum education
- Museum fatigue
- Museum label
- Cité de l'Architecture et du Patrimoine
- Types of museum
