= Wiechers =

Wiechers is a surname. Notable people with the name include:

- Alfredo Wiechers Pieretti (1881–1964), Puerto Rican architect
- Enrique Graue Wiechers (born 1951), Mexican academic and ophthalmologist
- Jim Wiechers (1944–2018), American golfer

== See also ==
- Casa Wiechers-Villaronga, is a Neo-classical style mansion in Ponce, Puerto Rico
- Wiechers-Sport, is a German auto racing team
