= Jorge Rigau =

Puerto Rican architect and writer

Jorge Rigau (born 1953 in Arecibo, Puerto Rico) is a Puerto Rican architect, historian, author and pedagogue. He is the founder (1995) and first dean of the New School of Architecture of the Polytechnic University of Puerto Rico (1995–2006). Rigau is a Fellow of the American Institute of Architects (FAIA).

== Projects ==
- New School of Arquitechture at Politechnic University of Puerto Rico, Hato Rey, Puerto Rico (Addition and Rehabilitation 2011–2013)
- Gazebo and Commemorative Fountain at Main Plaza, Vieques, Puerto Rico (Built 2008)
- Spivak-Velilla Residence, Bayamón, Puerto Rico (Built 2007)
- Infill Housing, Vega Baja, Puerto Rico (Built 2006)
- Billoch-Vázquez Residence, San Juan, Puerto Rico (Remodeled 2006)
- Historic Preservation of Old Train Station, Vega Baja, Puerto Rico (Built 2005)
- New Entrance for the Old Cemetery, Vega Baja, Puerto Rico (Built 2005)
- Nassar-Yumet Residence, Humacao, Puerto Rico (Built 2002)
- Casillas-Márquez Residence, Humacao, Puerto Rico (Built 2001)

== Publications ==
Rigau is the author of a number of books, including Puerto Rico 1900: Turn of the Century Architecture in the Hispanic Caribbean 1890-1930 (1992), Havana (with Nancy Stout) (1994) and most recently, "Puerto Rico then and now", published by Thunder Bay Press in 2009.

== See also ==
- List of Puerto Rican architects
