= Villa Julita =

Building in Aibonito, Puerto Rico

- U.S. National Register of Historic Places
- Puerto Rico Historic Sites and Zones
- Location within Puerto Rico
- Location: 401 San Jose Ave. (PR-14, Km 51.7) Aibonito, Puerto Rico
- Coordinates: 18°08′38″N 66°15′28″W
- Area: less than one acre
- Built: 1915
- Architect: Alfredo Wiechers Pieretti; Salvador Lando (builder)
- Architectural style: Beaux Arts, Criollo style
- NRHP reference No.: 86003491
- RNSZH No.: 2000-(RCE)-21-JP-SH

Significant dates
- Added to NRHP: December 19, 1986
- Designated RNSZH: December 21, 2000

Villa Julita, also known as Casa Ulrich, is a private building in Aibonito, Puerto Rico which is on the National Register of Historic Places and on the Puerto Rico Register of Historic Sites and Zones. Currently in good condition and located at its original site, it was designed by architect Alfredo Wiechers Pieretti and built by Salvador Lando, in 1915, for the Vendrell-Suárez family.

The architect who was a native of Ponce, had studied in Paris, and won a gold medal for his achievements in 1905. He graduated in 1905 and worked in Barcelona with Eric Sangier until 1911.

Villa Julita is a mansion built of wood with some of its facade in concrete: the colonnade, the stairway and the balustrade. These elements give it a neoclassical look to what is a Creole style structure, following in the tradition of haciendas and summer houses of the time. In 1917, the residence was sold to the Wirshing Serrallés family.

In 1950, the Ulrich Foundation allowed it to host conscientious objectors of the wars of Korea and Vietnam.

The Mennonite Foundation bought the property in 1972 and used this land to carry out instruction and guidance to farmers. The Mennonites are responsible for introducing modern methods for the mass production of fruits and plants, as well as artificial insemination techniques for livestock.

Harry Nussbaum and Linda Ulrich, the current owners purchased it in 1974 and spent four years restoring it.

It is now a children's preschool. Villa Julita maintains its elegance and serves as a testimony to a time when Aibonito was a favorite summer holiday for well-to-do families.
