= Bridge No. 122 =

Historic bridge in Naguabo, Puerto Rico

- U.S. National Register of Historic Places
- Puerto Rico Historic Sites and Zones
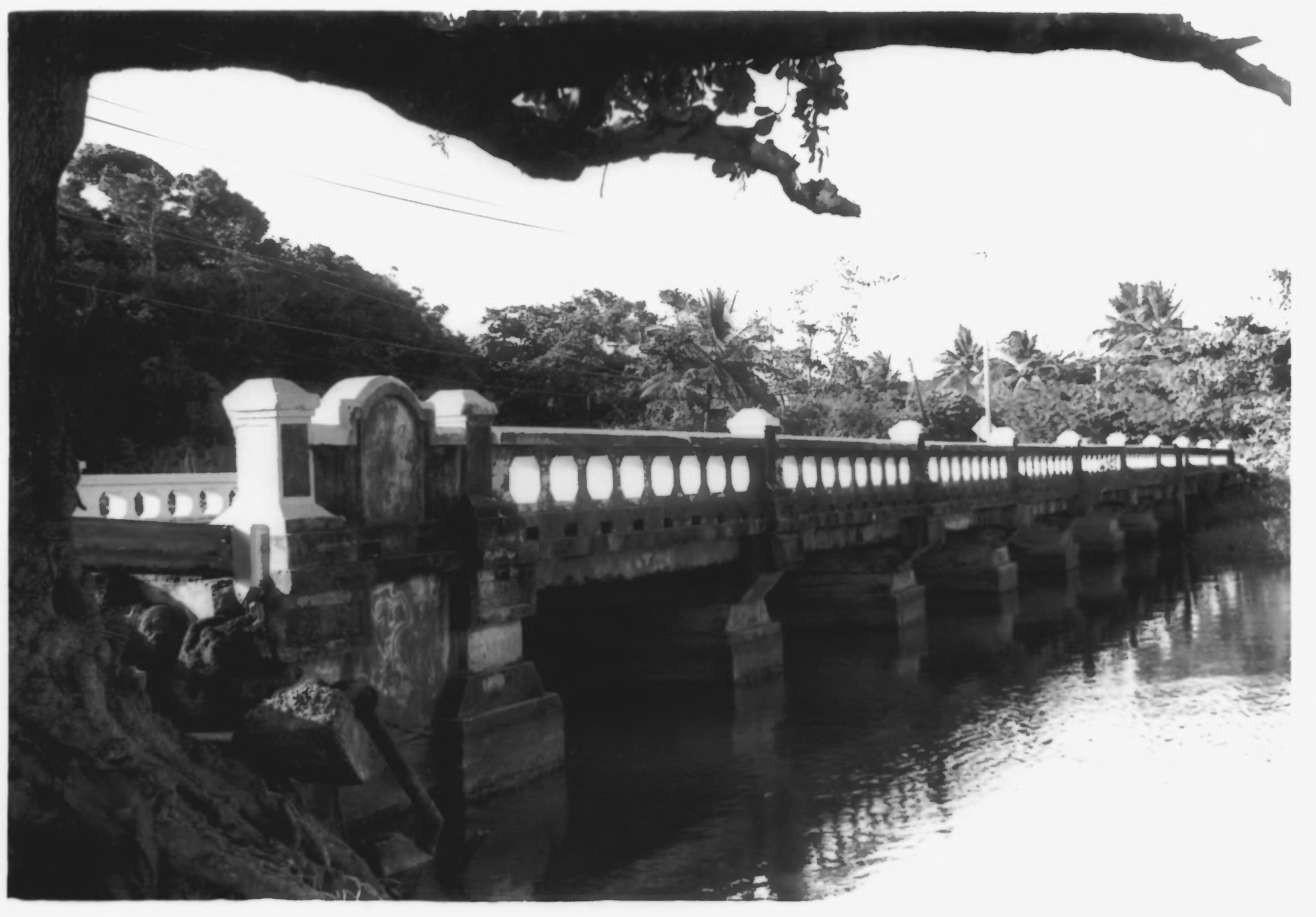

- Location within Puerto Rico
- Location: Highway 3, km 9 Barrios Río and Húcares; Naguabo municipality Puerto Rico
- Coordinates: 18°11′18″N 65°43′30″W
- Built: 1918, 1967
- Built by: Félix Benítez Rexach
- Architect: Rafael Nones
- MPS: Historic Bridges of Puerto Rico MPS
- NRHP reference No.: 95000836
- RNSZH No.: 2000-(RE)-18-JP-SH

Significant dates
- Added to NRHP: July 19, 1995
- Designated RNSZH: May 16, 2001

Bridge No. 122, spanning the Santiago River near Naguabo, Puerto Rico, is significant as "one of the earliest and most elegant examples of concrete beam bridges in Puerto Rico". Built in 1918, it was "futuristic" for its time and has noteworthy architectural detail relative to others. It was designed by Rafael Nones and built by Felix Benitez-Rexach, both engineers, both regarded as masters in their work. Its construction was financed by Puerto Rico's second public bond issue for public works, in 1916, which raised $2 million.

The bridge was modified in 1967 but remains the best-preserved example of its type in Puerto Rico.

The bridge has a 7.1-metre (23 ft) span, a total length of 64 metres (210 ft), and a roadway width of 8.5 metres (28 ft).

It was identified as historically important in a review of Puerto Rico's 640 pre-1945 bridges in 1994, and was listed on the National Register of Historic Places in 1995 and on the Puerto Rico Register of Historic Sites and Zones in 2003.

== See also ==
- Las Cabanas Bridge, another joint work of Nones and Benitez-Rexach
