= Santiago River (Puerto Rico) =

River of Puerto Rico

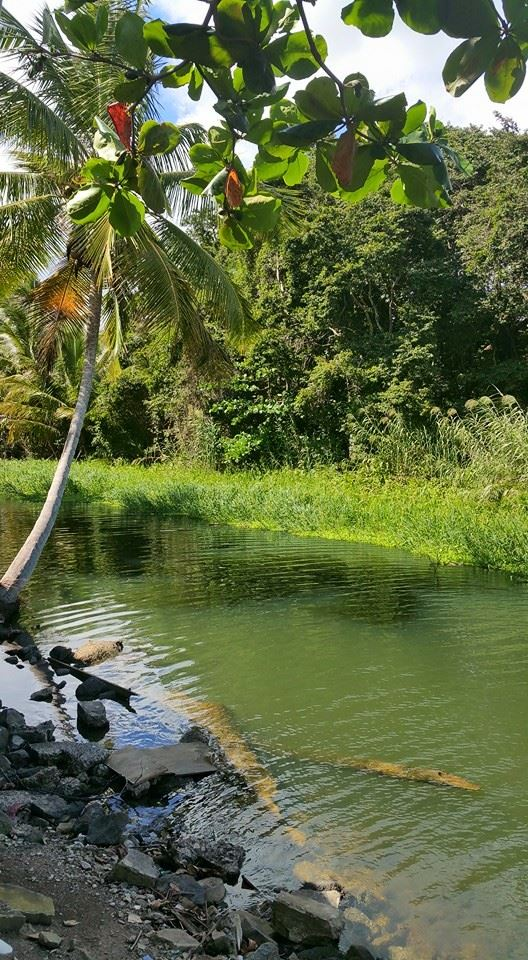
- Santiago River near Bridge No. 122
- Native name: Río Santiago (Spanish)

Location
- Commonwealth: Puerto Rico
- Municipality: Naguabo

Physical characteristics
- Source
  - coordinates: 18.1880148°N 65.7251616°W
- Length: 5.95 miles
- Basin size: 6.84 sq miles

Río Santiago is a short river of Puerto Rico. About 5.95 miles (9.58 km) long, it is spanned by historic Bridge No. 122 on the coastal road near barrio Duque in Naguabo, Puerto Rico. It discharges into the Caribbean Sea from Naguabo.

== Gallery ==
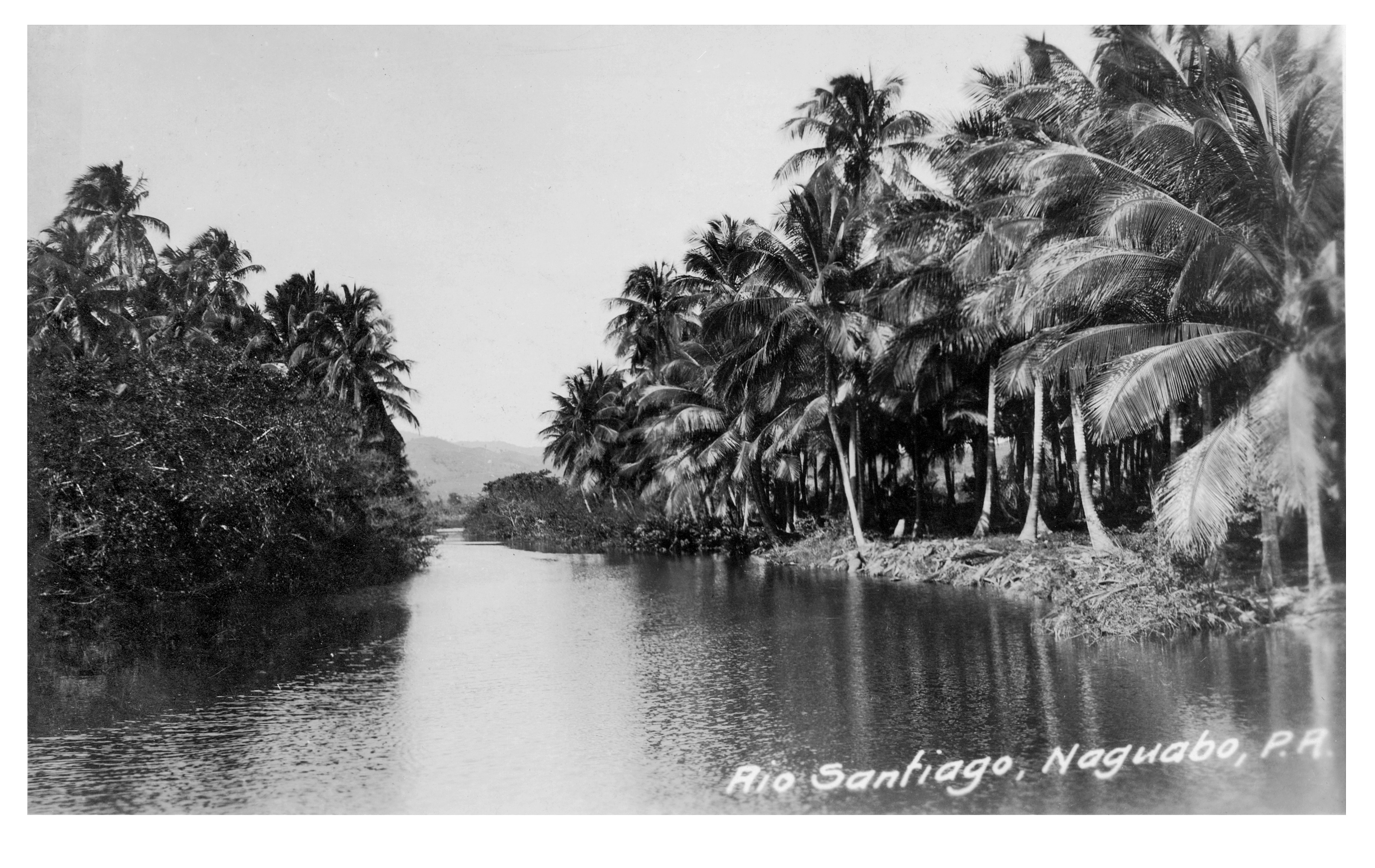
Santiago River in 1915

== See also ==
- List of rivers of Puerto Rico
