= Félix Benítez Rexach =

Puerto Rican architect

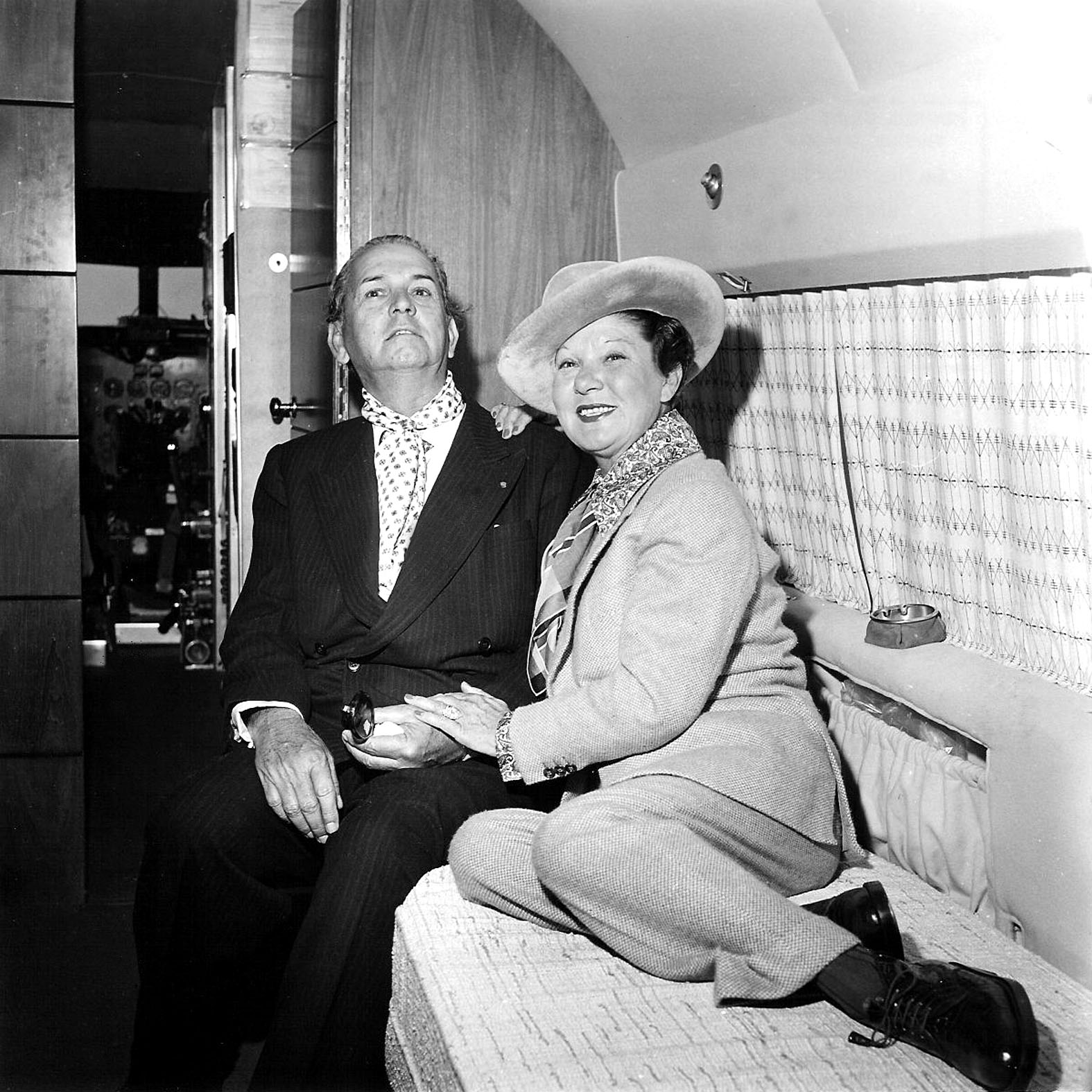
- Félix Bénitez Rexach with his wife
- Born: March 27, 1886; Vieques, Puerto Rico
- Died: November 2, 1975 (aged 89); San Juan, Puerto Rico
- Occupations: Engineer and businessman
- Known for: Building the Normandie Hotel
- Movement: Puerto Rican Independence
- Spouse: Lucienne Dhotelle

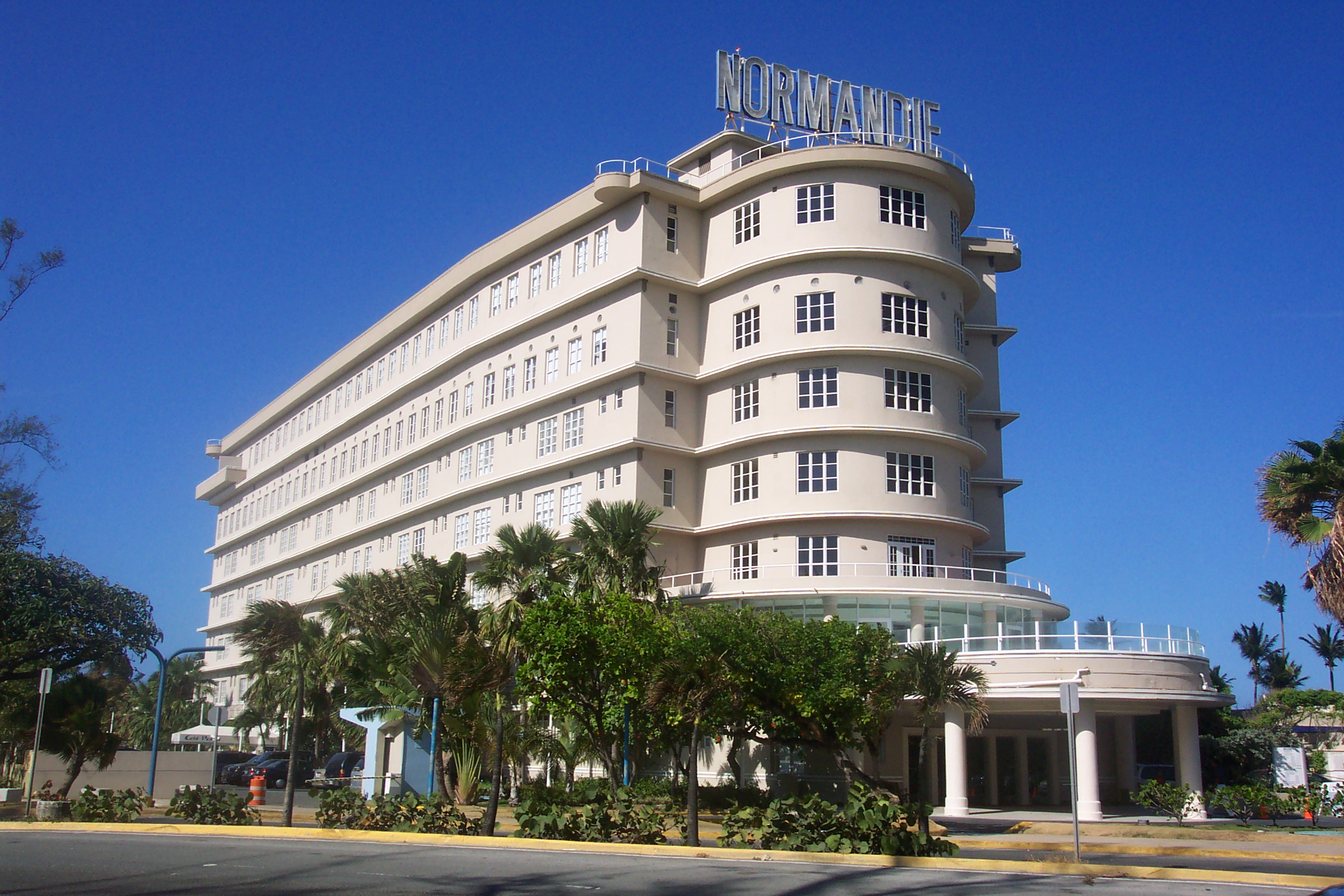
View of the Normandie Hotel from Muñoz Rivera Avenue

Félix Benítez Rexach (March 27, 1886 – November 2, 1975) was a Puerto Rican engineer and businessman who built the Normandie Hotel, located in San Juan, Puerto Rico.

== Life and career ==
Benitez Rexach was born in Vieques. In 1928, he fell in love with and married Lucienne D'hotelle, a French singer better known as La Môme Moineau (the kid sparrow).

=== Normandie Hotel ===
Benítez Rexach decided to surprise his wife with the construction of a yacht as a replica of the majestic ship. Moineau wasn't satisfied and Benítez Rexach decided then to construct a hotel with the form of a great transatlantic vessel. Designed by architect Raúl Reichard (1908–1996), the hotel began construction in 1938. He named the "Normandie Hotel" in honor of the French liner and presented it as a gift to his beloved wife and to the people of Puerto Rico. The hotel opened on October 10, 1942 at an estimated cost of more than US$2,000,000.

=== Bridges ===
Rexach designed and/or built a number of Puerto Rico's historic bridges, including the "futuristic" Bridge No. 122 and Las Cabañas Bridge (both of those being joint works with designer Rafael Nones).

=== Other works ===
Benítez Rexach also worked on various projects in the Dominican Republic, as a consequence of the friendship which he had with that country's dictator, Rafael L. Trujillo. Among his works in that country were the Port of Santo Domingo and the "Avenida Jorge Washington" (George Washington Avenue).

=== Political beliefs ===
Benítez Rexach was a passionate Puerto Rican patriot and a personal friend of Pedro Albizu Campos, president of the Puerto Rican Nationalist Party. He was a firm believer in the Puerto Rican independence movement and once visited Luis A. Ferré, the pro-statehood Governor of Puerto Rico, at the governor's mansion and asked him to proclaim the independence of Puerto Rico, since in his words: "Puerto Rico was a superior nation and the most developed in the Caribbean."

== See also ==
- List of Puerto Ricans
- List of Puerto Rican architects
- USS Natchez (PF-2)

== Bibliography ==
- "LA MÔME MOINEAU" by Michel Ferracci-Porri 380 pages, published in November 2006 by Editions Normant (ISBN 978-2-915685-28-2) is the first biography of Félix and Moineau Benitez.
