= Quinta Vendrell =

Historic building in Adjuntas municipality, Puerto Rico

- U.S. National Register of Historic Places
- Puerto Rico Historic Sites and Zones
- Location within Puerto Rico
- Location: Junction of Highways 143 and 123; Barrio Portugués; Adjuntas municipality Puerto Rico
- Coordinates: 18°08′50″N 66°41′24″W
- Built: 1918
- Architect: Alfredo Braulio Wiechers Pieretti
- Architectural style: Late Victorian
- NRHP reference No.: 06000028
- RNSZH No.: 2008-34-01-JP-SH

Significant dates
- Added to NRHP: February 9, 2006
- Designated RNSZH: September 26, 2008

Quinta Vendrell, in Adjuntas, Puerto Rico, is believed to have been designed by architect Alfredo B. Wiechers Pieretti. It is a two-story balloon framed country house that was built in 1918. It was listed on the U.S. National Register of Historic Places in 2006 and on the Puerto Rico Register of Historic Sites and Zones in 2008.

The home sustained damages as a result of Hurricane Maria on September 20, 2017, and in 2019, the owners were in talks with community representatives about how to raise funds to repair it.
