= Casa Wiechers-Villaronga =

Historic house in Ponce, Puerto Rico

- Villaronga House
- U.S. National Register of Historic Places
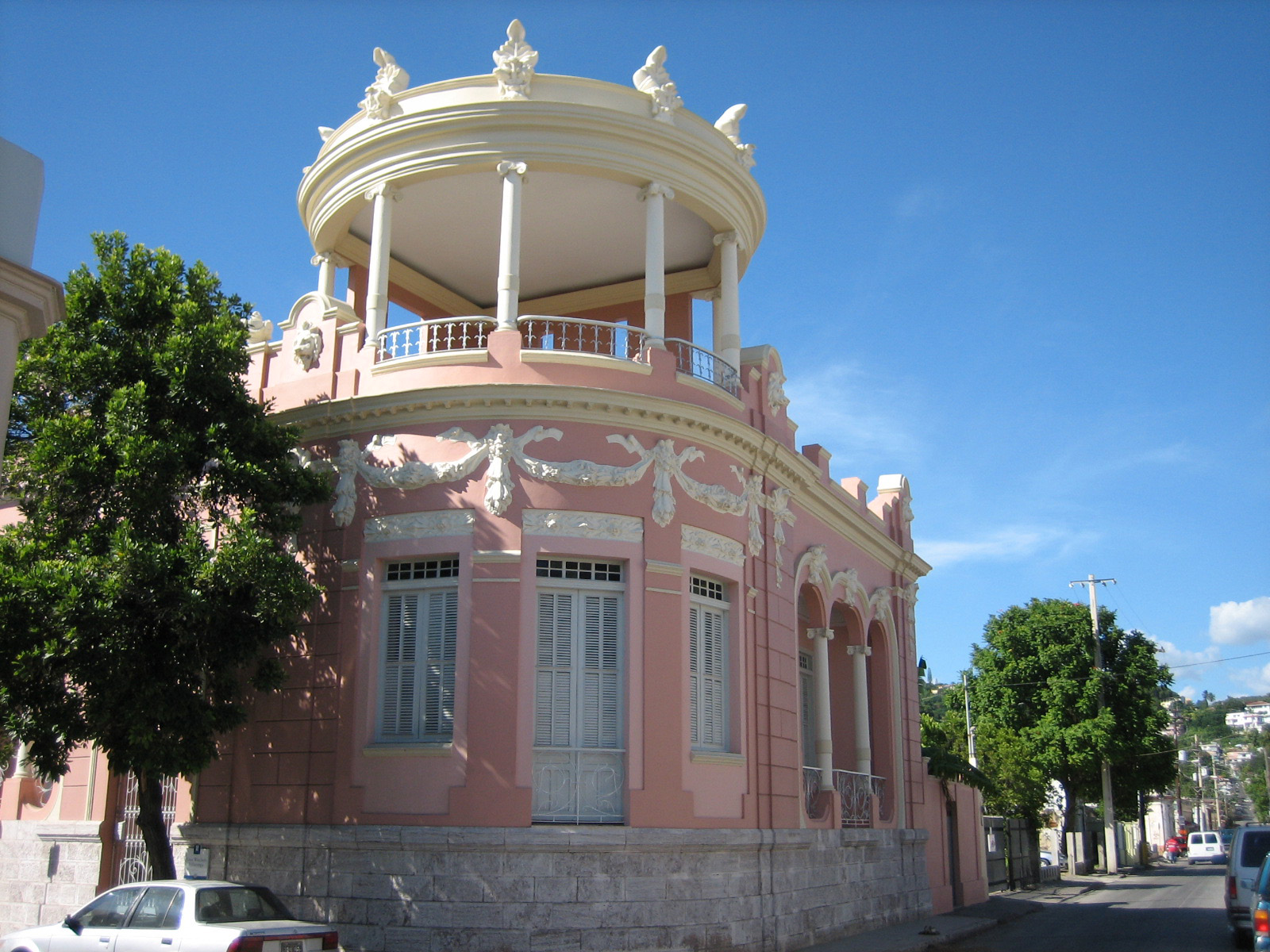
- Casa Wiechers-Villaronga

- Location within Puerto Rico
- Location: 106 Reina St. (NW corner of Reina and Mendez Vigo streets), Ponce, Puerto Rico
- Coordinates: 18°00′44″N 66°36′57″W
- Area: less than one acre
- Built: 1912
- Architect: Alfredo B. Wiechers
- Architectural style: Classical Revival
- NRHP reference No.: 84003151
- Added to NRHP: 24 August 1984

Casa Wiechers-Villaronga is a Classical Revival style mansion in Ponce, Puerto Rico designed and built in the early twentieth century. The house was acquired and restored by the Institute of Puerto Rican Culture and now operates as the Museo de la Arquitectura Ponceña (Museum of Ponce Architecture). The house sits in the Ponce Historic Zone. The Villaronga Residence is an outstanding example of the Classical Revival style in used in Ponce designs in the early part of the 20th century and is one of two residences still standing of a series of houses designed and built by Alfredo B. Wiechers, so important to the architectural and cultural heritage of the city of Ponce.

== Significance ==
The Wiechers-Villaronga Residence was built in 1912 by Alfredo B. Wiechers, architect, for his own residence and studio, which he sold later to Mr. Julio Mercado, who in turn give it to his daughter, Elena Mercado and her husband Mr. Gabriel Villaronga as a wedding present. Wiechers was born in Ponce and studied at the School of Architecture in Paris, France, in 1901, where he was bestowed a gold medal for outstanding achievement and excellence during his professional studies. He graduated in 1905 and worked at the office of Enric Sagnier, a famous Spanish architect, in Barcelona, Spain. In 1911, he decided to work and live in Ponce; thus he designed and built his house and studio which he opened in 1912. In a short period of time, from 1911 to 1918, Wiechers was commissioned with various important buildings such as: the Loggia Aurora, Club Deportivo de Damas, the Havana Theatre, Banco of Ponce Building, and Santo Asilo de Damas Hospital among others, where he fully expressed the European Neo-Classical style which he learned from, and was influenced by, Enric Sagnier.

The Neo-Classical influence is manifested in most of his buildings and particularly in the Villaronga residence for its richness and highly decorative details (pilasters, rusticated podium, cornices, "candelabra", relief and motifs, Ionic capitols, etc. are some of the decorative details of the Neo-Classical trend). The Villaronga Residence is an outstanding example of this style and is one of two residences still standing of a series of houses designed and built by Wiechers, so important to the architectural and cultural heritage of the city of Ponce.

Of special importance is the fact that all the furniture is original, including the bathroom appliances. Most of the furniture belongs to the Modernisme style (Catalan Art Nouveau) and were imported from Barcelona, Spain. The hanging tapestry were painted by Librado Net.

== History ==
The structure was designed in 1911 by its original owner, the local Ponce architect Alfredo Wiechers. It was built in the same year by Elías Concepción Albizu. In 1918, the house was acquired by the Villaronga Mercado family. The house was listed on the U.S. National Register of Historic Places in 1984 as Villaronga House.

== Architecture ==
The structure is considered "treasure trove of culture", a jewel amongst the many antique Ponce mansions that have been preserved and converted into museums. The building possesses elaborate neoclassical details, a majestic roof-top gazebo, and a full set of original and custom-made Catalan modernist furniture. There are also well-preserved shower and bathroom fixtures.

== Physical appearance ==
The Wiechers-Villaronga Residence is a U-shaped, one-storied structure, measuring 68'-10" in width by 95'-2" in length, located at the northeast corner of Reina and Mendez Vigo Streets. Behind all its highly elaborated decoration, with European Baroque influence, essentially the structure is Neo-Classic in style, making a unique and yet elegant combination of both styles. The building rests on a rusticated stone podium; its facades and main walls are of brick masonry with some interior partitions and walls of the gallery and kitchen in wood. Wooden beams supports a galvanized zinc roof. The windows and doors of the building are wooden with movable louvers and fixed colored glass inlets. A variety of flooring material is used throughout the house: from native cement-colored tiles in the dining area and vestibule, 1" by 6" tongue-and-groove wood slats in the living area and bedrooms, and ceramic tiles in the bathroom, to marble tiles at the entry-way.

The Baroque's influence is manifested immediately on the building's rounded corners, typical of these residence types in Ponce. The corner is framed by two rusticated pilasters and divided into three bays, by two pilaster strips or lesenes. Each bay contains a wooden movable louvreed window with glass inlets at its top, and a floral relief motif over the fenestration. The rest of the wall is decorated with floral garlands. The corner is accentuated with a round sitting nook or "glorieta", that is detailed with Ionic columns. Another interesting feature of the house are the balconies which are divided into three sections with Ionic columns and framed with Baroque moldings and sculptured faces on the central top part of the openings. The forged-iron railings of the balconies are elaborated after the Art Nouveau style. The facades are crowned with a continuous masonry cornice. On top of this cornice, a battlement-type parapet with sculptured lion faces and "candelabra" decorates the roof line of the structure.

The main entrance is off-centred and located on Reina Street. The entrance hall is decorated with sculptured tiles and the door is located at the end of a marbled stairway. The interior is well kept and unaltered. The interior areas are painted in different colors and the walls have a decorative plastered Art-Nouveau frieze. The ceiling in most of the areas is decorated embossed tin with a continuous decorative molding at its corners. The gallery and part of the kitchen walls are wooden with fixed wood louvered windows used for better ventilation and light. Other interesting details on the house are: the bathroom fixtures, such as the shower stall and the ceramic wall tiles which were imported from Barcelona, Spain, the light fixtures—such as the ones at the dining-room, the master bedroom and living room—which were also imported from Spain, and a "medio punto" at the dining area, typical of the architecture of this Southern area of Puerto Rico.

== Owner ==
Alfredo Wiechers Pieretti himself designed the house. He was the son of a German colonist and his Corsican wife. He was born in Ponce and educated at the Paris' L'Ecole Spéciale d'Architecture. He lived for six years in Barcelona while working at Enric Sagnier i Villavecchia's distinguished studio. After leaving his architectural mark on the City of Ponce (Casa Serralles 1911, Casa Oppenheimer 1913) he sold the house to the Villaronga family and fled in 1919 to Barcelona, under political pressure. Although his prolific works (1911–1918) include hotels, stores, mausoleums, and even factories, the majority of his work was done in Ponce—he ventured out of Ponce only to design two structures for wealthy Catalan families in the neighboring mountain towns of Adjuntas and Aibonito.

The house was purchased by Don Julio Mercado, father of Helena Mercado, and given to Helena Mercado as a wedding present upon marriage to Mr. Villaronga. Fact by Luis R. Mercado, Great Grandchild of Julio Mercado.

== Restoration ==
The house was restored by the Institute of Puerto Rican Culture (ICP) in the early 1990s and is now opened as the Museum of Puerto Rican Architecture. Its furnishings - all original - speak to the social history in the city during the early twentieth century. The various rooms of the residence display aspects of Ponce's architecture.

== Museum ==
The museum opened in 1996 as the home of the Ponce Architecture and Urban Planning Museum. The goal was to showcase Ponce's rich architectural heritage. The structure is considered a "gem of fine Art Nouveau from a bygone era". It has an extensive collection of displays and photos of master works from Blas Silva Boucher, Francisco Porrata Doria, Alfredo Wiechers Pieretti and other prominent local architects from the early 20th century.

The city of Ponce, considered by some as the "irrefutable guardian of Puerto Rican criollismo", was selected as a member of the prestigious Art Nouveau Route of the European Union for its "world preservation of modernist heritage".

== See also ==
- Museo de la Arquitectura Ponceña
