= Schifferstadt (Frederick, Maryland) =

Historic house in Maryland, United States

- Scheifferstadt
- U.S. National Register of Historic Places
- U.S. National Historic Landmark
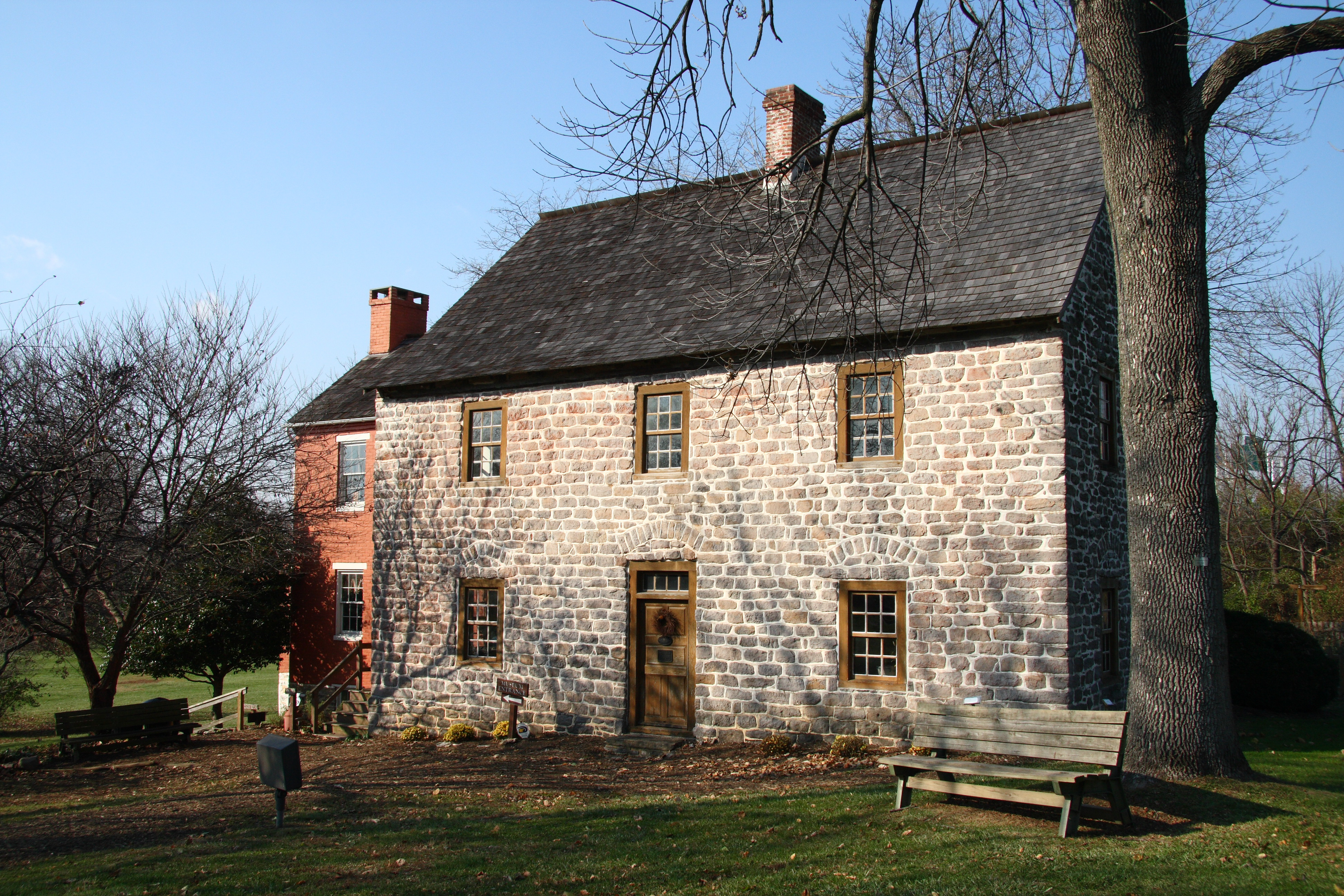

- Location within Maryland Location within the United States
- Location: 1110 Rosemont & 2nd St., W., Frederick, Maryland
- Coordinates: 39°25′24″N 77°25′39″W
- Area: 1 acre (0.40 ha)
- Built: 1758
- NRHP reference No.: 74000952, 100000833

Significant dates
- Added to NRHP: July 22, 1974
- Designated NHL: December 23, 2016

Schifferstadt, Also known as Scheifferstadt, is the oldest standing house in Frederick, Maryland. Built in 1758, it is one of the nation's finest examples of German-Georgian colonial architecture. It was designated a National Historic Landmark in 2016. Home to the Frederick County Landmarks Foundation, the site is open to visitors on weekends from April through December as a local history and architectural museum.

== History ==
The stone house was completed in 1758 as were the three cast iron five-plate stoves used to heat the rooms. Only one survives. The house stands on land settled by German immigrant farmers Josephus and Cathrina Brunner (later alternately spelled 'Bruner' and 'Brooner') in 1736. In time, Brunner purchased 303 acres (123 ha) of a 7,000-acre tract land known as "Tasker's Chance" from Frederick Town (current-day Frederick) developer Daniel Dulany. Brunner named the property after Klein Schifferstadt, Cathrina's (nee Thomas) home town in the Rhineland-Palatinate region of southwestern Germany near Mannheim. Three grown sons and two married daughters settled on nearby parcels. One of which was Anna Barbara Bruner Getzendanner the eldest daughter. The Brunners first built a log cabin, but after 17 years in the log house, Josephus sold Schifferstadt to his sons, Jacob Brunner b.25 Feb 1703 and Heinrich (Elias) Bruner b.15 Feb 1723 • Both born in Klein-Schifferstadt, Rheinland, Rheinland-Pfalz, Germany. and both died d.1783 • Frederick, Frederick County, Maryland.

In 1758 Jacob and Elias and his wife Albertina along with Christian Getzendanner and Anna Barbara Getzendanner (nee) Bruner built or completed the stone house that has stood for 260 years and today is a prized feature of Frederick’s early days. It is some 3000 square feet 4 story counting the "Summer Kitchen" (slaughterhouse ground floor on the creekside) and the attic used for drying herbs and the like. It featured two huge hearth fireplaces and four "5 plate" stoves for heating the bedrooms. One stove has survived and the date on it is the reason for the estimated date of completion for the main stone house. There is one huge bedroom for the traveling Preacher and Teachers that the families used. There were secondary cabins used along the stream property as there was about 2800 acres in all.

Children of Josephus and Cathrina Brunner were: Anna Barbara Bruner 1701–1773 JOHANN JACOB Brunner 1703–1783 Gabriel Brunner 1706–1719 JOHANNES "JOHN" PETER Brunner 1708–1776 Johann Valentine Brunner 1711–1722 JOHANN HEINRICH "HENRY" Brunner Sr. 1715–1774 Anna Maria Catharina Brunner 1718–1766 Heinrich Elias Bruner 1723–1783

Josephus Bruner and family built a log houses on the site, cleared land, established a farm and lived there for several years. Brunner died Feb 17, 1753, and the property ultimately went to his youngest son Elias , who clearly prospered enough to build the fairly large stone house that stands today. Josephus had moved into the nearby town of Frederick possibly because of ill health as the property was some distance from town at the time.

The Getzendanner and Bruner family graveyard is located on the VFW golf course. It was rediscovered overgrown in 1966 during the construction of the Golf Course. The Eldest Daughter Anna Barbara Bruner (1701-1773) was married to Christian Getzendanner b.1691 • Klein,Schifferstadt,Germany d.1766 • Frederick, Frederick County, Maryland, USA

== Architecture ==
The sandstone for Schifferstadt's two-foot-thick walls may have come from a local quarry near Walkersville Maryland. The hand-hewn wood beams were pinned together with wooden pegs. Above the windows and doors on the first floor of the building are reinforcing stone arches, supporting the outside walls above them. The roof is considered to be unusual with kick-up, or flared eaves. The house has a large "wishbone" chimney, gathering flues from all four fireplaces into one chimney. In the parlor and upstairs bedrooms were three "Five Plate" cast iron boxes that kept most of the house warm. Also called jamb stoves, these were parts of a clean, energy-efficient radiant heating system, fed by fireplaces in the center hall. One is still there—the only one anywhere known still to be in its original place—and is the basis for dating the house at 1758 because of the date cast into the plates. Much of the original construction and detailing survives, showing particular examples of German influence, including a narrow efficient staircase to the second floor. Schifferstadt is known to be the finest existing example of German colonial architecture in the United States.

== Ownership, disrepair and restoration ==
The house was owned by Brunner's family and descendants until 1899 when it was sold (along with 94 acres) to Frederick resident Edward C. Krantz for $16,000. The house remained in the Krantz family until July 1974 when it was sold to Frederick County Landmarks Foundation. The foundation subsequently restored Schifferstadt and today operates it as an architectural and local history museum.

Schifferstadt was listed on the National Register of Historic Places on July 22, 1974 and was designated a National Historic Landmark on December 23, 2016.

== See also ==
- List of National Historic Landmarks in Maryland
- National Register of Historic Places listings in Frederick County, Maryland
