= Normandie Hotel =

Historic building in San Juan, Puerto Rico

- Hotel Normandie
- U.S. National Register of Historic Places
- U.S. Historic district – Contributing property
- Puerto Rico Historic Sites and Zones
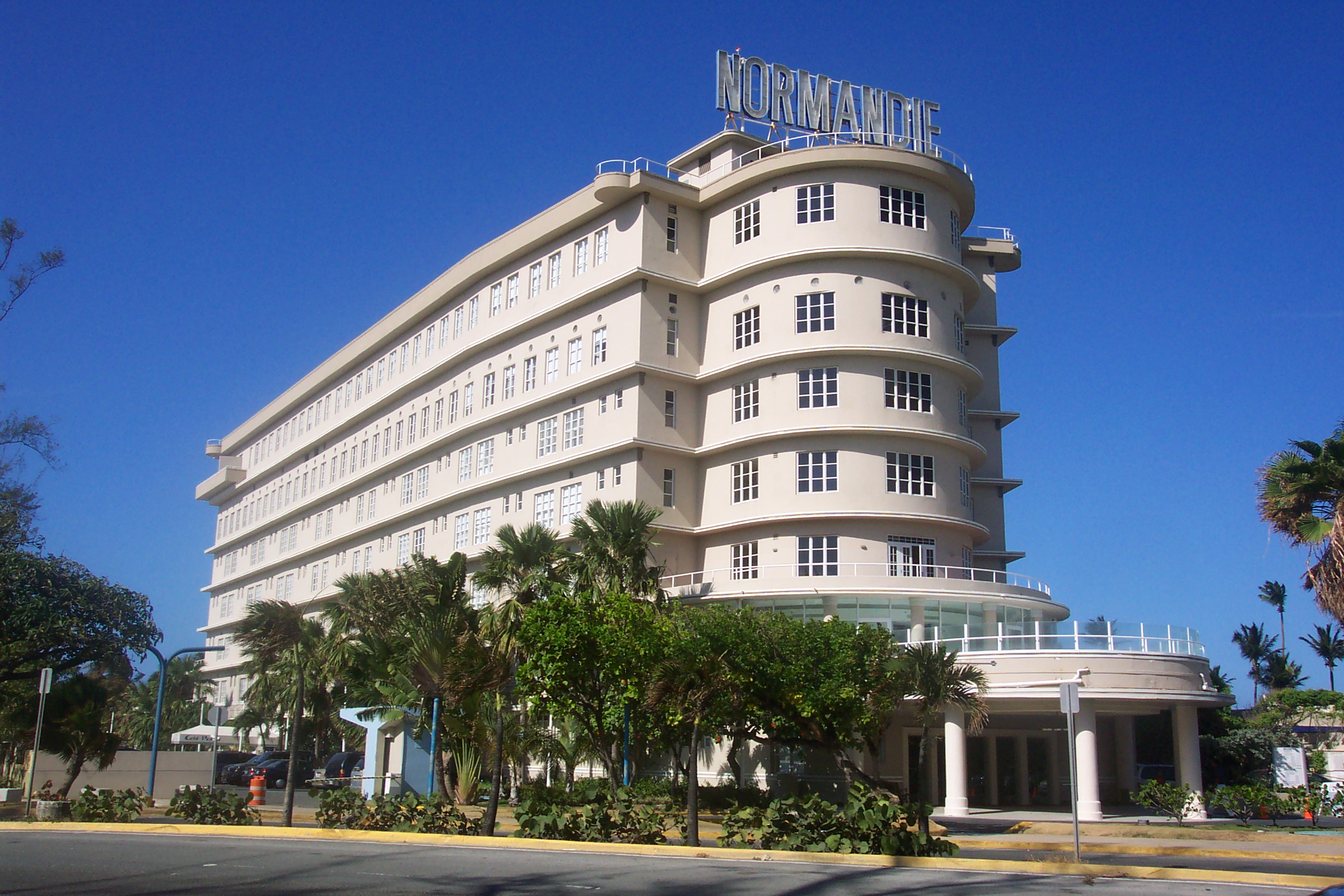
- View of the Normandie Hotel from Muñoz Rivera Avenue, October 2007

- Location within Puerto Rico
- Location: Ponce de León Ave. and San Gerónimo St., San Juan, Puerto Rico
- Coordinates: 18°27′52″N 66°05′15″W
- Built: 1942
- Architect: Raúl Reichard & Félix Benítez Rexach
- Architectural style: Art Deco, Streamline Moderne
- Part of: Puerta de Tierra Historic District
- NRHP reference No.: 80004295
- RNSZH No.: 2000-(RMSJ)-00-JP-SH

Significant dates
- Added to NRHP: August 29, 1980
- Designated RNSZH: February 3, 2000

The Normandie Hotel is a historic building located in the Isleta de San Juan, in San Juan, Puerto Rico which opened on October 10, 1942 as a hotel. Its design was inspired by the French transatlantic passenger ship SS Normandie in addition to featuring the same Art Deco design as the ocean liner that inspired it, and the hotel's original roof sign was one of the two signs that adorned the top deck of the SS Normandie but were removed from it during an early refitting. It is an example of what came to be known as the Streamline Moderne architecture style.

As of 2021 the building was vacant and not in operation and in 2022, was sold to private owners who said they plan to renovate it.

== History ==
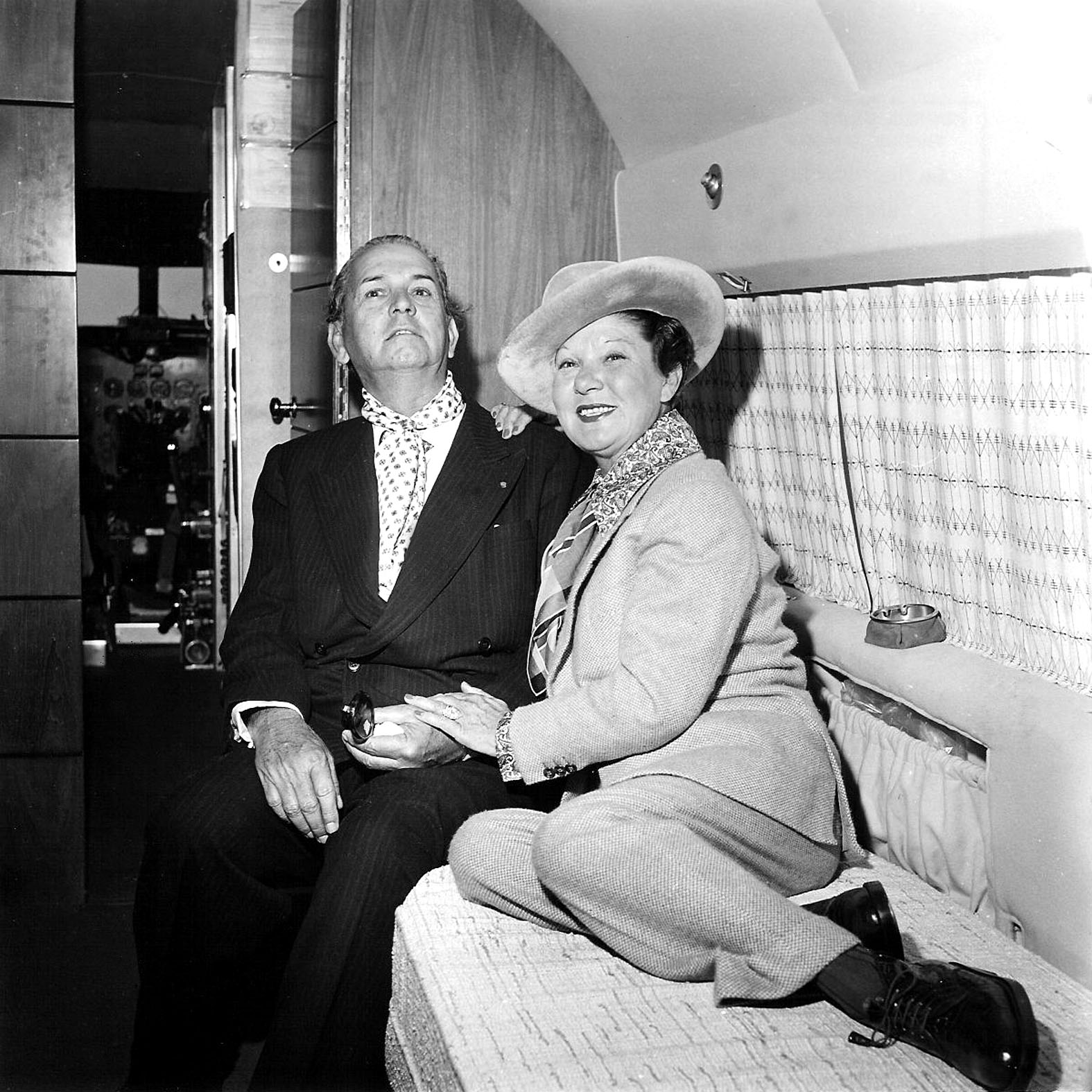
Félix Bénitez Rexach and Lucienne D'Hotelle

The Normandie Hotel was the brainchild of Puerto Rican engineer Félix Benítez Rexach. He married the French singer Lucienne D'Hotelle in 1927 or 1928; reportedly, he built the hotel as a wedding present for his bride. He served as the president of the Escambron Development Company, which was incorporated in approximately 1943 to issue bonds to finance the completion of the hotel. Escambron owned and operated the hotel.

The hotel was designed by architect Raúl Reichard (1908–1996) and construction began in 1938. The hotel's exterior was designed to resemble the famed luxury ocean liner, elongated and curved in front and back, with porthole-shaped lights on the facade of the 6th floor, as well as on the front on all floors except the front entrance and 2nd floor. Inside, the hotel features art deco design, complete with Roman, Egyptian, and French details, high ceilings, corridors looking down into a central skylighted atrium, banisters that resemble those on ships on the edges of all floors except the lobby, a pool outside in the back shaped similarly to the hotel's, and had blue or orange awnings above the windows on the upper floors until the hotel closed in the 1960s.

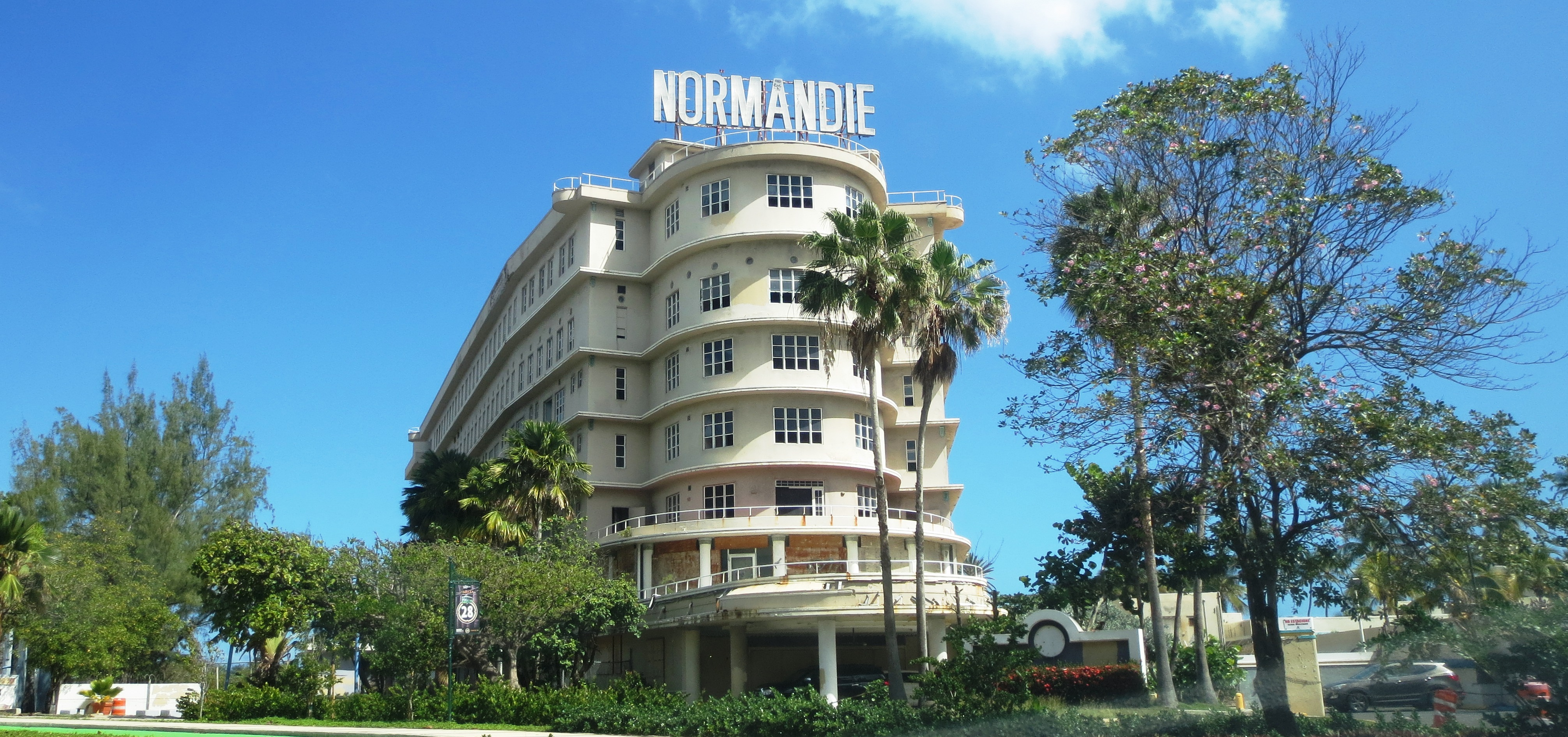
The hotel in 2016

Designers and artists from Puerto Rico, Dominican Republic, France, and Spain all contributed to the hotel's overall construction. When it opened on October 10, 1942, it became an instant sensation among the island's social elite. Completed at a cost of more than US$2,000,000, the hotel catered to many major Hollywood and Latin American film stars such as Cantinflas, Libertad Lamarque and Jorge Negrete. The hotel also served as a performing arts venue for many of Puerto Rico's top entertainers, such as Ruth Fernández, Myrta Silva, Sylvia Rexach, and Carmen Delia Dipini.

The coastline of Puerto Rico was expropriated by the federal government for defense during World War II, including the hotel, and Benítez Rexach, who had moved to the Dominican Republic in 1944, reportedly protested by refusing to pay his property taxes. However, court records indicate Benítez Rexach had argued unsuccessfully that as an American citizen without congressional representation, he was exempt from federal taxes. After being closed and abandoned in the 1970s, the hotel was restored in the late 1980s. Afterwards, it underwent massive renovations due to heavy damage caused by Hurricane Georges in 1998. After storm-related damages were repaired, the hotel remained in business until 2004, when another renovation project commenced. In early 2005, the 173-room hotel reopened after its refurbishing and would operate as a Boutique Hotel for 4 years, before closing again by late 2010, since then the hotel has remained unused and vacant for over a decade.

The Normandie Hotel was purchased on August 8, 2013, by Ben Medetsky and Jack Polatsek of Interra Capital Group for nearly US$4,000,000 but after initial plans for redevelopment of the hotel, the group decided to sell it. In 2015, the owners removed the hotel's historic roof sign in order to protect and preserve it, and only the structure that held up the letters of the sign remains. Although various groups of investors attempted to purchase the property in 2014, then in the spring of 2017 and again in the spring of 2018, it wasn't actually sold until January 2022.

Majority Leader Ángel Matos García (PPD) filed Joint House Resolution 0089 in March 2021; if passed, the Puerto Rico Department of Economic Development and Commerce would seize the property and demolish the hotel. The Institute of Puerto Rican Culture made a statement opposing the resolution two days later. Later that year, despite rumors to the contrary, Hard Rock International denied that it was interested in the hotel. The hotel was purchased by the Ishay Group for US$8.6 million, who plan to restore the hotel and reopen it, possibly converting some rooms into residences.

== Recognition ==
The Normandie Hotel was added to the U.S. National Register of Historic Places in 1980. and to the Puerto Rico Register of Historic Sites and Zones in 2000.

== Popular culture ==
- Professional boxer Hector Camacho was the victim of a hidden-camera joke consisting of someone pretending to steal one of his cars while he was at the Normandie Hotel training for one of his fights early in the 1990s, for an Hector Marcano television show named "Marcano... el show".
- The 2001 music video for singer Sade Adu's song "King of Sorrow" (from her Lovers Rock album) was filmed in and around the hotel by director Sophie Muller.
- The hotel served as a locale for one of the four stories that helped compose the storyline for the 2001 film 12 Horas directed by Puerto Rican director Raúl Marchand Sánchez.
- The lobby of the hotel was used to shoot scenes from the 2009 film A Perfect Getaway.

== See also ==
- List of hotels in Puerto Rico
