= Museo de la Arquitectura Ponceña =

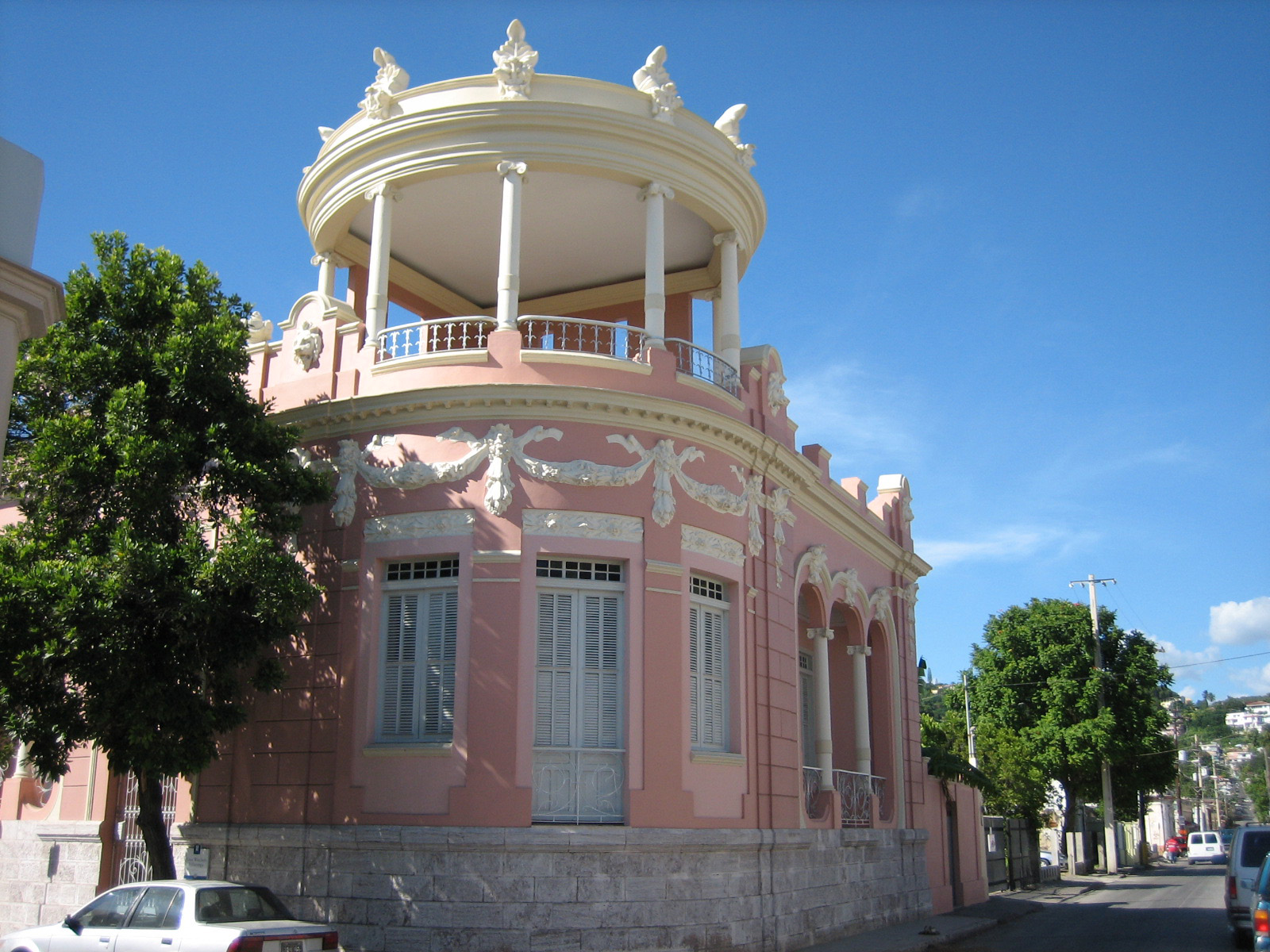
- Museo de la Arquitectura Ponceña

- Location within Puerto Rico
- Established: 1996
- Location: Calle Reina #106, NW corner of Calle Reina and Calle Mendez Vigo, Ponce, Puerto Rico
- Coordinates: 18°0′44.3298″N 66°36′56.937″W
- Type: Museum
- Owner: State (ICP)

The Museo de la Arquitectura Ponceña (Museum of Ponce Architecture) is an architecture museum housed at the Casa Wiechers-Villaronga, in Ponce, Puerto Rico. It is preserves the history of the architectural styles of Ponce and Puerto Rico. The Casa Wiechers-Villaronga was acquired and restored by the Institute of Puerto Rican Culture. The museum is located in the Ponce Historic Zone. The historic house was designed and built in 1912 by Alfredo B. Wiechers. The house that is home to this architecture museum is itself an example of the architectural history of the city. The museum is housed at the historic Casa Wiechers-Villaronga.

== History ==
In 1912, architect Alfredo B. Wiechers built the Wiechers-Villaronga Residence for his own residence and studio.

From 1911 to 1918, Wiechers was commissioned with various important buildings in Ponce, such as the Logia Aurora, Club Deportivo de Damas, the Teatro Habana, Banco of Ponce building, and Santo Asilo de Damas Hospital among others, where he fully expressed the European Neo-Classical style which he had learned from European training.

In 1919, feeling political persecution from the American invaders, Mr. Wiechers sold the house to Mr. Gabriel Villaronga and moved to his native France. Many generations of Villarongas lived the house through the twentieth century.

In the early 1990s, and in order to establish the Museo de la Arquitectura Ponceña, the house was acquired and restored by the Institute of Puerto Rican Culture (ICP). In 1996, the museum opened as the home of the Museo de la Arquitectura Ponceña y Planeacion Urbana (Ponce Architecture and Urban Planning Museum). The goal was to showcase Ponce's rich architectural heritage.

== Location ==
The museum is a U-shaped, one-storied structure, measuring 68'-10" in width by 95'-2" in length, located at the northeast corner of Calle Reina and Calle Mendez Vigo. It is one block west of Plaza Las Delicias, the center of the Ponce Historic Zone. Calle Reina has several other historic houses on it, including Residencia Subirá and Casa Miguel C. Godreau.

== Architecture ==
The structure that is home to the museum is considered a "treasure trove of culture", a jewel amongst the many antique Ponce mansions that have been preserved and converted into museums. The museum possesses elaborate neoclassical details, a majestic roof-top gazebo, and a full set of original and custom-made Catalan modernist furniture. There are also well-preserved shower and bathroom fixtures.

Behind all its highly elaborated decoration, with European Baroque influence, essentially the structure is neo-classic in style, making a unique and yet elegant combination of both styles. The museum rests on a rusticated stone podium; its facades and main walls are of brick masonry with some interior partitions and walls of the gallery and kitchen in wood. Wooden beams supports a galvanized zinc roof. The windows and doors of the museum are wooden with movable louvers and fixed colored glass inlets. A variety of flooring material is used throughout the house: from native cement-colored tiles in the dining area and vestibule, 1" by 6" tongue-and-groove wood slats in the living area and bedrooms, and ceramic tiles in the bathroom, to marble tiles at the entry-way.

The Baroque's influence is manifested immediately on the museum's rounded corners, typical of these residence types in Ponce. The corner is framed by two rusticated pilasters and divided into three bays, by two pilaster strips or lesenes. Each bay contains a wooden movable louvreed window with glass inlets at its top, and a floral relief motif over the fenestration. The rest of the wall is decorated with floral garlands. The corner is accentuated with a round sitting nook or "glorieta", that is detailed with Ionic columns. Another interesting feature of the house are the balconies which are divided into three sections with Ionic columns and framed with Baroque moldings and sculptured faces on the central top part of the openings. The forged-iron railings of the balconies are elaborated after the Art Nouveau style. The facades are crowned with a continuous masonry cornice. On top of this cornice, a battlement-type parapet with sculptured lion faces and "candelabra" decorates the roof line of the structure.

Some of the outstanding architectural features present in this museum are highly decorative and detailed pilasters, rusticated podium, cornices, "candelabra", relief and motifs, Ionic capitols, etc. They readily depict the Neo-Classical trend of the epoch. The Villaronga Residence is an outstanding example of this style and is one of two residences still standing of a series of houses designed and built by Wiechers, so important to the architectural and cultural heritage of the city of Ponce. Of special architectural importance is the fact that all the furniture is original, including the bathroom appliances. Most of the furniture belongs to the Modernisme style (Catalan Art Nouveau) and were imported from Barcelona, Spain. The hanging tapestry were painted by Librado Net, a famed local artist.

The main entrance is off-centered and located on Reina Street. The entrance hall is decorated with sculptured tiles and the door is located at the end of a marbled stairway. The interior is well kept and unaltered. The interior areas are painted in different colors and the walls have a decorative plastered Art-Nouveau frieze. The ceiling in most of the areas is decorated embossed tin with a continuous decorative molding at its corners. The gallery and part of the kitchen walls are wooden with fixed wood louvered windows used for better ventilation and light. Other interesting details on the house are: the bathroom fixtures, such as the shower stall and the ceramic wall tiles which were imported from Barcelona, Spain, the light fixtures—such as the ones at the dining-room, the master bedroom and living room—which were also imported from Spain, and a "medio punto" at the dining area, typical of the architecture of this Southern area of Puerto Rico.

== Displays ==
The museum has an extensive collection of displays and photos of master works from the most prominent architects of early 20th century Ponce: Blas Silva Boucher, Francisco Porrata Doria, Alfredo Wiechers Pieretti. The city of Ponce, considered by some as the "irrefutable guardian of Puerto Rican criollismo", was selected as a member of the prestigious Art Nouveau Route of the European Union for its "world preservation of modernist heritage".

== See also ==
- Casa Wiechers-Villaronga
- Ponce Creole
