= Casa Oppenheimer =

Historic house in Ponce, Puerto Rico

- U.S. National Register of Historic Places
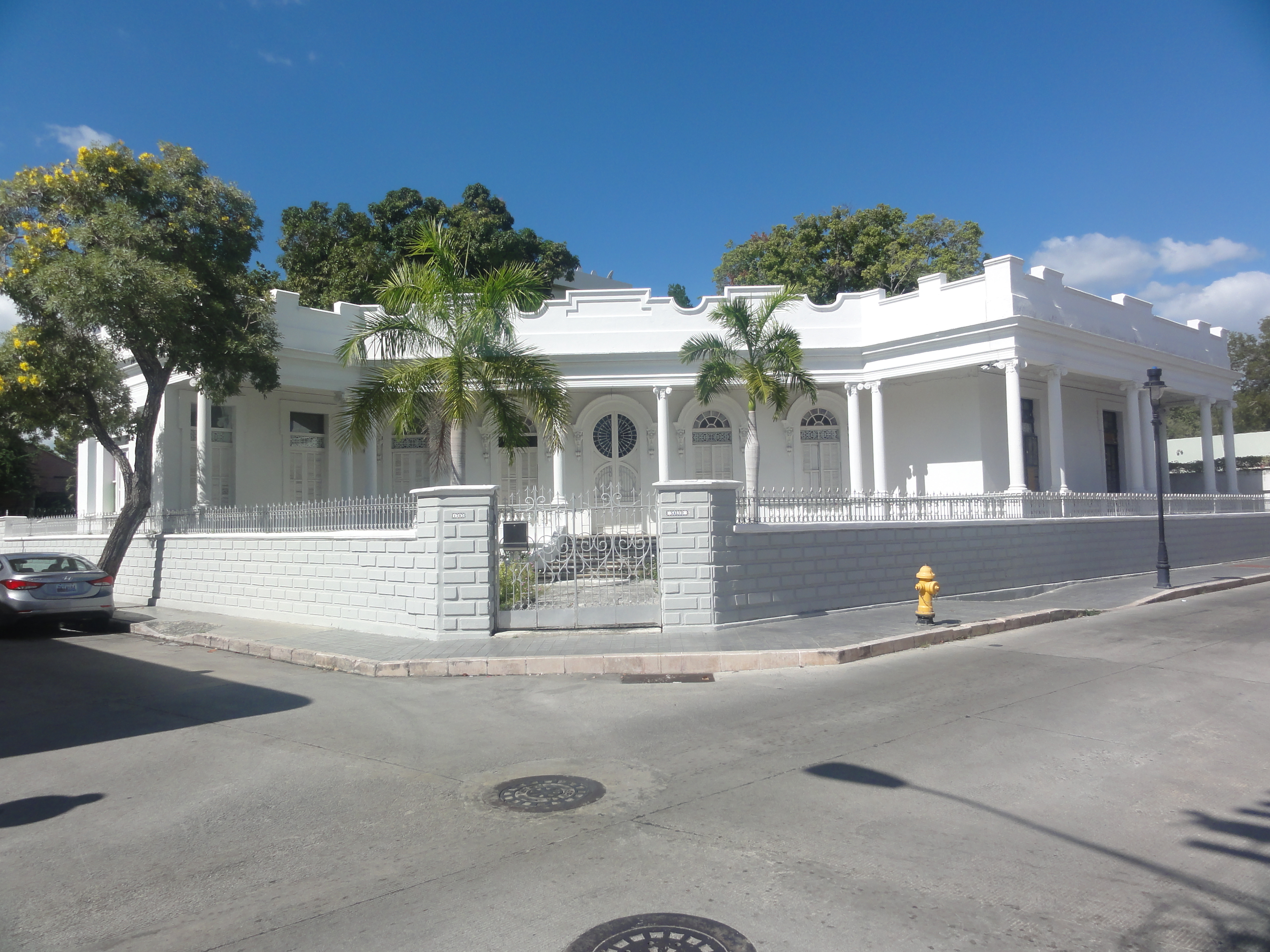
- Casa Oppenheimer in 2014

- Location within Puerto Rico
- Location: Calle Salud No. 47 (NW corner with Calle Aurora), Ponce, Puerto Rico
- Coordinates: 18°00′34″N 66°36′43″W
- Area: < 1 acre
- Built: 1913
- Architect: Alfredo B. Wiechers Pieretti
- Architectural style: Art Nouveau
- NRHP reference No.: 87001824
- Added to NRHP: 29 October 1987

Casa Oppenheimer (English: Oppenheimer House) is a historic house in Ponce, Puerto Rico, designed in 1913 by famed Puerto Rican architect Alfredo B. Wiechers. The house is unique among other historic structures in historic Ponce for its skillful incorporation of front gardens in a very limited urban space. The historic building is located at 47 Salud Street, in the city's historic district, at the northwest corner of Salud and Aurora streets. The house is also known as Casa del Abogado (House of the Attorney). In April 2019, the house was turned into Casa Mujer by MedCentro, a women's health business concern.

== History ==
The Oppenheimer House is one of Ponce's most distinctive residential structures. It was designed in 1913 for Doña Isabel Oppenheimer-de Santiago (Note: Historian Socorro Giron states that, in 1899, there was also in Ponce an "Isabel Oppenheimer de Subira" (Ponce, el teatro La Perla y La Campana de la Almudaina. 1992. Page 398.)) by one of Puerto Rico's foremost early 20th century architects, Alfredo Weichers. Two years earlier, in 1911, he had built Casa Serralles, which today is home to the Museum of Puerto Rican Music. Mr. Weichers left Puerto Rico to study architecture in Barcelona, Spain, and returned to Ponce where he built various structures in the Spanish-Art Nouveau style. Weichers designed many of the mansions of Ponce's aristocratic society of his time. The Oppenheimer residence is one such structure. Architecturally, the house is the result of an artful combination of elements from the contemporary modernist movement and the simpler townspeople's building traditions used in the hot southern coast of Puerto Rico.

Prominent in this property is the used of a chamfered front entrance gate. This front entrance into the property follows the chamfered pattern delineated by the city street at the corner of Salud and Aurora streets. This designed responded to city ordinances which mandated the incorporation of chamfered corners in urban city lots. This design, along with the use of a mirror-image chamfered design of the front of the house proper, provided the property with a significant amount of frontal garden space, uncommon in city lots just two blocks from Ponce's main Plaza, as is the case of this house.

== Significance ==
The residence is "one of the best examples in Ponce of the Puerto Rican adaptation of the architecture of the Barcelona School, and forms an integral part of the series of late 19th and early 20th century grand houses which defines the unique urban character of the center of Ponce."

== Architecture ==
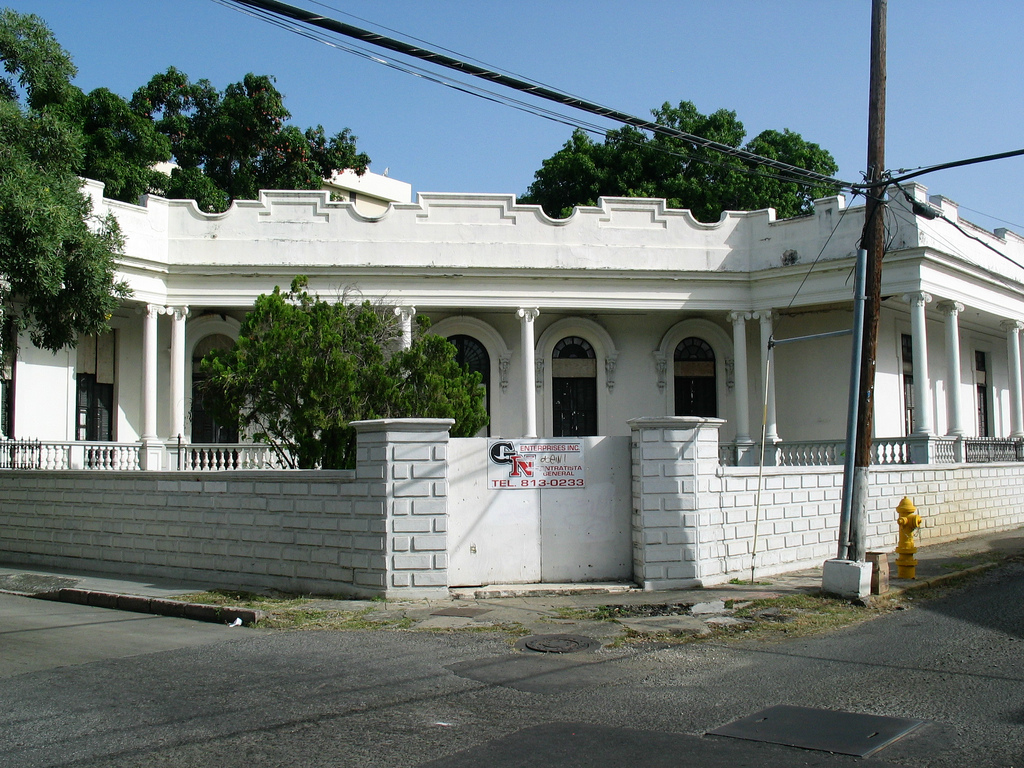
Casa Oppenheimer in 2010

The house is a raised, one-storey, brick and masonry residential structure on the northwest corner of Salud and Aurora streets, in Ponce's Historic Zone. It is oriented on a diagonal axis with respect to the street corner. The main facade of the house face the street corner. At both ends of this frontal facade, the house plan turns an angle so that the front facade becomes first perpendicular and then parallel to the corresponding side street. The property is surrounded by a 4-foot plastered masonry wall with an 18-inch high wrought iron railing above. The small, diagonal front chamfered gate is also built in wrought-iron. The frontal facade consists of a concave shape and incorporates a podium porch, Ionic columns, a recessed loggia, and a cornice with a battlement parapet above. The raised loggia porch incorporates concrete balustrades the full length of the balcony. The loggia porch is reached from the front gardens via a wide masonry stairway. The loggia incorporates five bays that establish the central section of the frontal concave facade. The front is highlighted by five arched windows.

== See also ==
- Puerto Rico State Historic Preservation Office Files
- Ponce Historic Archives
