= Alfredo Wiechers Pieretti =

Puerto Rican architect

- Born: 26 March 1881; Ponce, Puerto Rico
- Died: 15 July 1964; Barcelona, Spain
- Resting place: Montjuïc Cemetery
- Occupations: Engineering, Architect
- Notable work: Casa Serrallés, Oppenheimer House, Blasini Residence, Quinta Vendrell, Club Deportivo de Ponce, Logia Aurora, Club Deportivo de Damas, Teatro Habana (aka, Teatro Rivoli), Banco of Ponce, Hospital Santo Asilo de Damas, Casa Wiechers-Villaronga, Monumento a los heroes de El Polvorín
- Movement: Neoclassical architecture
- Spouse: Carmen Gilet

Alfredo Wiechers Pieretti was a Puerto Rican architect from Ponce, Puerto Rico. He was an expositor of the Neoclassicism and Art Nouveau architectural styles, doing most of his work in his hometown of Ponce. Today, Alfredo Wiechers' city residence, located in the Ponce Historic Zone and which he designed himself, is a museum, the Museo de la Arquitectura Ponceña. After enriching his hometown city with some of the most architecturally exquisite buildings, he moved to Spain arguing political persecution by the authorities in the Island.

== Early years ==
Alfredo Braulio Wiechers Pieretti was born in Ponce, Puerto Rico, on 26 March 1881. He was the youngest of five children born to the German Georg Friederich Wiechers Kelm and Isabel Pieretti Marsaud, a Ponceña woman of Corsican ancestry. Alfredo's father was a businessman from Hamburg, Germany who settled in Ponce around 1860 and in 1865 he was named Prussia's consul for Ponce. He was re-appointed in 1872 and 1874, at a time when Ponce was the capital of the southern region of Puerto Rico (San Juan was the capital of the northern region).

== Training ==
Upon the death of his father in Ponce, Wiechers Pieretti, still an adolescent, came to be under the guardianship of Juan Lacot, the husband of Rosa Wiechers Pieretti, Alfredo's oldest sister. A short while later they moved to Barcelona, and Alfredo started studies in Paris at the École Spéciale d'Architecture. In 1901, he was awarded a gold medal for outstanding achievement and excellence during his professional studies. He graduated in 1905 and worked at the office of Enric Sagnier, a famous Spanish architect, in Barcelona, Spain. He lived in Barcelona for six years while working at Enric's distinguished studio.

In 1908 Wiechers Pieretti married Ponce-born Carmen Gilet in Barcelona, and in 1910 he returned to Puerto Rico, settling in Ponce.

== His residence ==
Alfredo Wiechers returned to Ponce in 1910 and, within two years, he built what is known today as the Wiechers-Villaronga Residence. He built it as his own residence and studio. He later sold the pompous home to Mr. Gabriel Villaronga. In a short period of time, from 1911 to 1918, Wiechers was commissioned with various important buildings such as: the Logia Aurora, Club Deportivo de Damas, the Havana Theater, Banco of Ponce Building, and Santo Asilo de Damas Hospital among others, where he fully expressed the European Neo-Classical style which he had learned from Enric Sagnier. Alfredo Wiechers lived in his house for seven years.

== His works ==
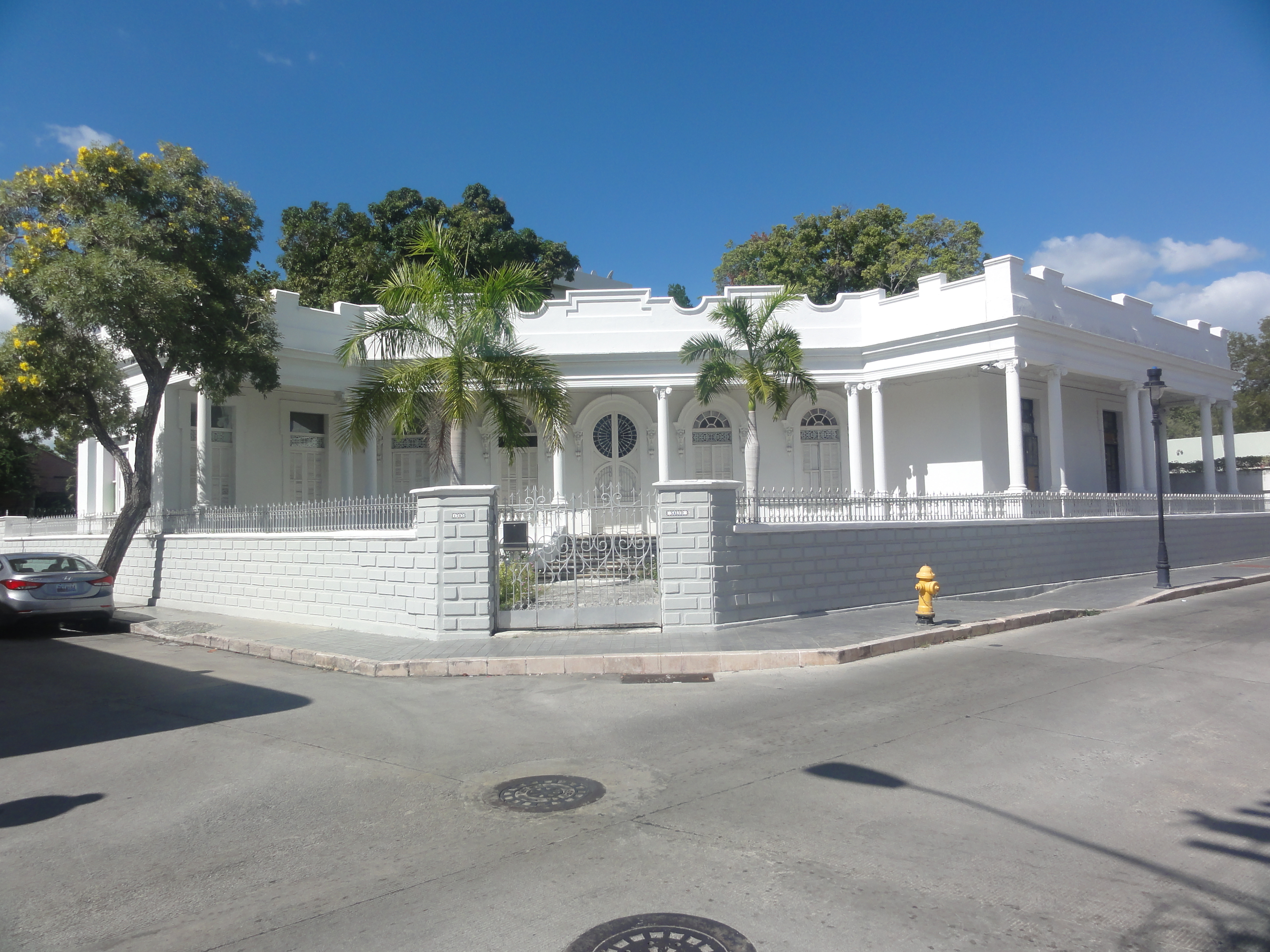
The Casa Oppenheimer, one of Wiechers' designs

After leaving his architectural mark on the city of Ponce (Casa Serralles, Oppenheimer House) he sold his house to the Villaronga family and fled in 1919 to Barcelona, under political pressure. Although his prolific works (1911–1918) include hotels, stores, mausoleums, and even factories, the majority of his work was done in Ponce—he ventured out of Ponce only to design two structures for wealthy Catalan families in the neighboring mountain towns of Adjuntas and Aibonito. His work in Puerto Rico includes the designs for Logia Adelphia, Don Eugenio Serralles Residence (Casa Serrallés), the Oppenheimer House, and the Blasini Residence. He also designed the Club Deportivo de Ponce (Ponce Sports Club), the Vendrell House, and homes for the Gelpí and Arce families. Wiechers designed and built Casa Serrallés (not to be confused with Castillo Serrallés) in 1911. This commodious residence is located in downtown Ponce, at the southeast corner of Calle Isabel and Calle Salud and is currently home to the Museo de la Música Puertorriqueña. In 1911, Wiechers also designed the Mausoleo del Cuerpo de Bomberos of the City of Ponce (Mausoleum of the Corps of Firemen of the City of Ponce) located at the Cementerio Civil de Ponce on Calle Cementerio Civil in barrio Canas Urbano.

He also designed Villa Julita also known as Casa Ulrich, a residence located in Aibonito, which is listed on the National Register of Historic Places.

== Later years and legacy ==
In 1918 Wiechers returned with his family to Spain, claiming political persecution by the authorities in Puerto Rico. After this, he never performed as an architect again for health reasons as well as not being on possession of a license to practice architecture. He died on 15 July 1964, and was interred at the Montjuïc Cemetery in Barcelona at the Mausoleum of the Gilet family.

He is honored at Ponce's Park of the Illustrious Ponce Citizens.

The Architecture and Construction Archives at the University of Puerto Rico (AACUPR) is the custodian of the Alfredo Wiechers Collection (1896–1986). Approximately 1.5 cubic feet in size, the collection contains architectural drawings, photographs, and publications. The Architectural Drawings Series contains 128 projects organized chronologically. The collection was transferred from the Puerto Rico Architects Association in 1998.

He also designed Quinta Vendrell, Barrio Portugués, located at the junction of PR-143 and PR-123, Adjuntas, Puerto Rico, which is listed on the National Register of Historic Places.

== See also ==
- List of Puerto Ricans
- German immigration to Puerto Rico
- Blas Silva
- Francisco Porrata Doria
- Wiechers-Villaronga Residence
