= Centro Español de Ponce =

Historic structure located in Ponce, Puerto Rico

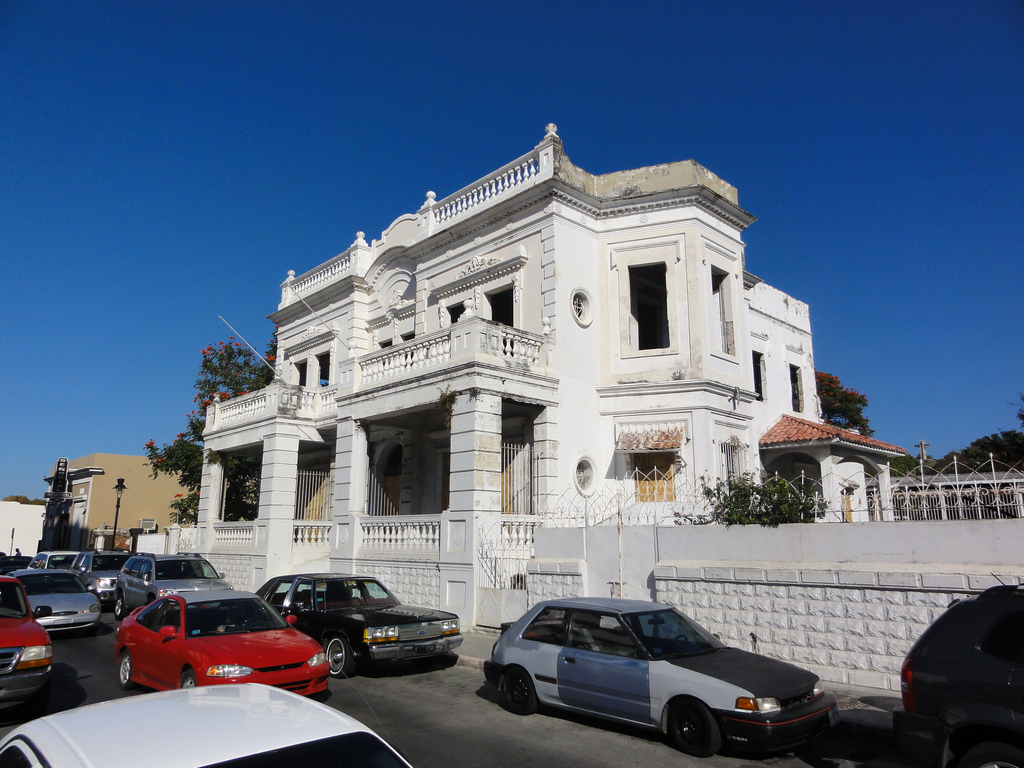
- Centro Español de Ponce
- Interactive map of the Centro Español de Ponce area

General information
- Architectural style: Neoclassical architecture
- Location: NW corner of Villa Street and Mendez Vigo, Ponce, Puerto Rico
- Coordinates: 18°1′31.51″N 66°34′12.86″W
- Construction started: 1911
- Completed: 1911
- Client: Don Fernando Manuel Toro and his wife, Doña Adela Cortada

Technical details
- Size: 20 ft (6.1 m) high, 18 ft (5.5 m) wide, 12 ft (3.7 m) deep

Design and construction
- Architect: Eduardo Salichs
- Engineer: Eduardo Salichs

The Centro Español de Ponce is a historic structure located in Ponce, Puerto Rico, dating to the early twentieth century and which served as the last headquarters of the Centro Español de Ponce, a Spanish heritage club. The structure is prominent among other Neoclassical architecture in Ponce because it is the first structure in Ponce built in that architectural style for use as a residence but then subsequently used as the headquarters of a prominent community-based civic organization, the Centro Español de Ponce, a Spanish heritage club.

== Location ==
The structure is located in Ponce, Puerto Rico, on the north side of Calle Villa, at the northwest corner of the intersection with calle Mendez Vigo.

== History ==
The house was designed in 1911 by Ponce architect Eduardo Salichs. It was built for Don Fernando Manuel Toro and his wife Doña Adela Cortada. The family occupied the house for several generations. On 17 November 1961, the building became the headquarters for the Centro Español de Ponce, a prominent civic organization working for the preservation of Spanish heritage in the city.

== Centro Español club ==
The Centro Español de Ponce club was founded on 14 October 1906. Its founders were a group of Spanish residents of the city of Ponce. Most prominent among its founders were Francisco Oliver Culvelje, Bartolome Arbona, Jacinto Arbona, and Pedro Gispert, but the total group of founders included some 20 other local Spanish residents. The purpose of the organization was to preserve the Spanish heritage in Ponce. The first meeting place was at 10 Plaza Las Delicias, on what is now the perimeter of Plaza Las Delicias. The club’s first directing board included such prominent Ponce residents as Bernardo Valdecilla, Pedro Juan Bonnin, Manuel Gandara, Antonio Vicens, Francisco Font, and Bartolome Melia.

Ponce architect Francisco Porrata Doria once presided over the club headquartered at their structure on Calle Villa, near Calle Mendez Vigo. In 1965, its president was Carlos Ortiz.

=== Events ===
One of the best documented events accomplished by the Centro Español club was the transfer of the remains of Don Rafael Martínez Illescas, a Spanish army commander who had died in the Spanish–American War during the Puerto Rico Campaign, from a Ponce cemetery to his hometown in Cartagena, Spain, on 20 May 1915.

In 1935, the Centro Español de Ponce club hosted Argentina’s king of Tango, Carlos Gardel. Contrary to popular belief, though, Gardel was not hosted at the Centro Espanol de Ponce building on Calle Villa, but at the Casino de Ponce, since at that time (1935) Centro Español de Ponce did not yet own the structure on calle Villa. The club purchased the structure on calle Villa on 17 November 1961.

== Subsequent tenants ==
Some time after 1970 the building became the Ponce regional office for the Fondo del Seguro del Estado (FSE), the government of Puerto Rico’s pension and health plan agency, until FSE opened new offices on Avenida Santiago de los Caballeros in 1985.

In 1985, the building became the headquarters for the Sociedad Historica de Ponce which occupied it until 1989. It has not been occupied since and is in ruins.

== See also ==
- Casa de España: Spanish organization in San Juan
