= Francisco Porrata-Doría =

Puerto Rican architect

- Born: Francisco Luis Porrata-Doría Gutierre de Pando; 4 May 1890; Ponce, Puerto Rico
- Died: 2 September 1971; Ponce, Puerto Rico
- Known for: Civil Engineering, Architect
- Notable work: Ponce Cathedral (1932 façade), Banco Crédito, Banco de Ponce, Fernando Luis Toro Home, Gomez Residence, Teatro Fox Delicias, Hotel Meliá, El Cometa Building, Hospital San Lucas (1907), Dr. Pila Clinic (1925), Mario Mercado Castle, Forteza Building, Gonzalez Building
- Movement: Neoclassical architecture
- Spouse(s): Isabel Armstrong Pou (1st); Gloria de la Pila Valdecilla (2nd)
- Children: Francisco Carlos Porrata-Doría Armstrong (1st marriage), José Luis Porrata-Doría Armstrong (1st marriage), Manuel Luis Porrata-Doría de la Pila (2nd marriage), Arturo Francisco Porrata-Doría de la Pila (2nd marriage)

Francisco Luis Porrata-Doría (4 May 1890 - 2 September 1971) was a Puerto Rican architect from Ponce, Puerto Rico. Porrata-Doría was a pioneer in the development of the local modern architecture and one of the architects responsible for what has been called "Ponce Monumental Architecture", of which the Banco Crédito is a good example.

== Early years ==
Francisco Luis Porrata-Doría Gutierre de Pando, sometimes shortened to Francisco Luis Porrata-Doria Pando, was born in Ponce, Puerto Rico, on 4 May 1890. His parents were Luis Porrata-Doría, mayor of Ponce in 1898, and Ana Gutierre de Pando. He grew up and was raised in Ponce. In 1909 he graduated from Ponce High School.

== Training ==
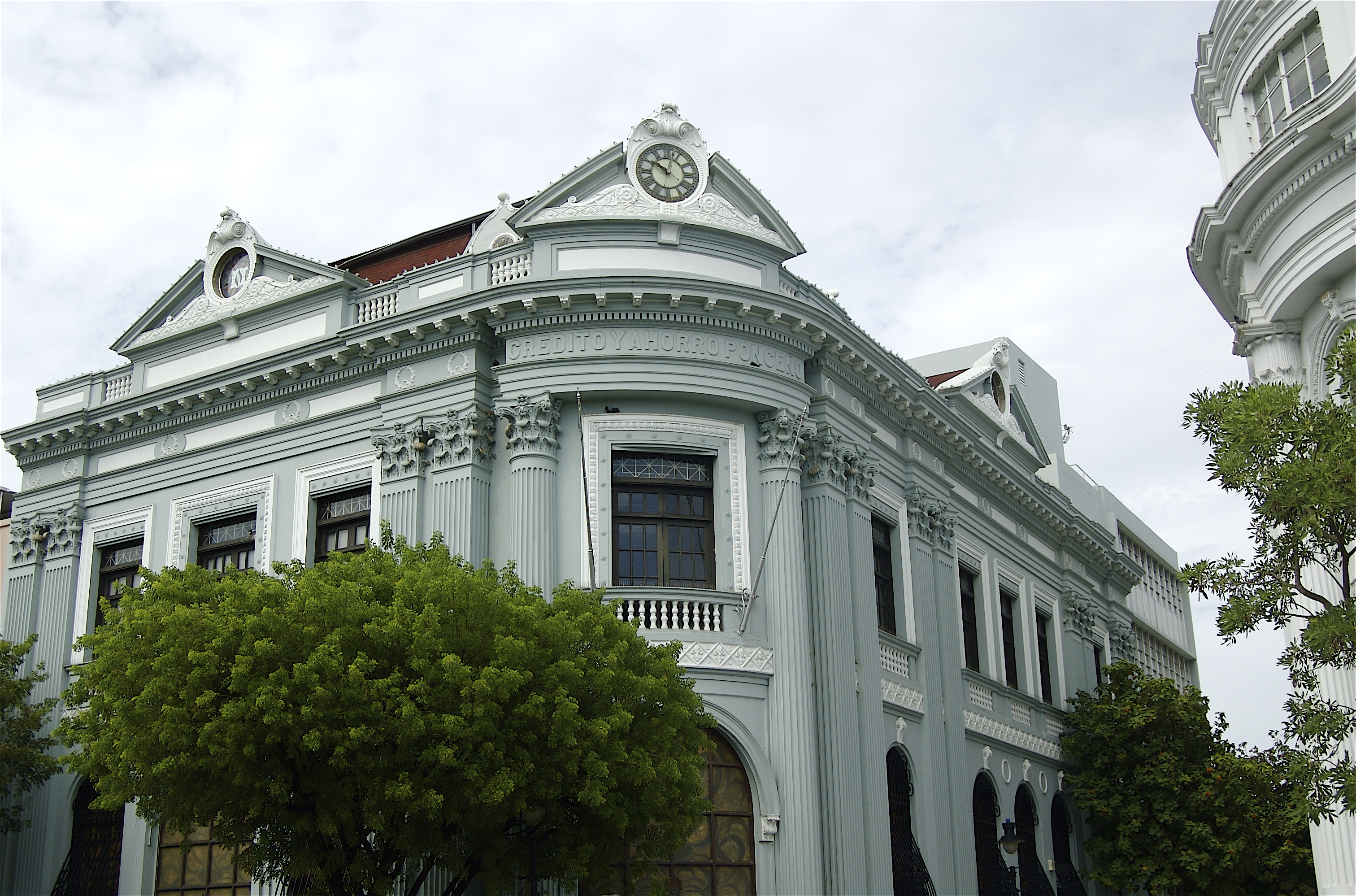
Banco Credito in Ponce, Puerto Rico, designed by Porrata Doria

In 1909 he enrolled at Cornell University where graduated with a degree in civil engineering and, in the summer of 1912 he took advanced architectural coursework at Columbia University, receiving a certificate in architecture.

== Director of Public Works ==
Returning to Puerto Rico, Porrata-Doria became director of Public Works for the Municipality of Ponce from 1912 to 1916. His most important public work at the time was Plaza Degetau.

== Personal life ==
In 1915 he married Isabel Armstrong Pou, daughter of Carlos Armstrong. They had two children, Francisco Carlos Porrata-Doria Armstrong and José Luis Porrata-Doria Armstrong, both of whom became physicians.

He remarried in 1939, after the death of his wife the previous year. His second wife was Gloria de la Pila Valdecilla, daughter of Dr. Manuel de la Pila Iglesias. They had two children, Manuel Luis Porrata-Doria de la Pila, an engineer, and Arturo Francisco Porrata-Doria de la Pila, a lawyer.

== Private practice ==
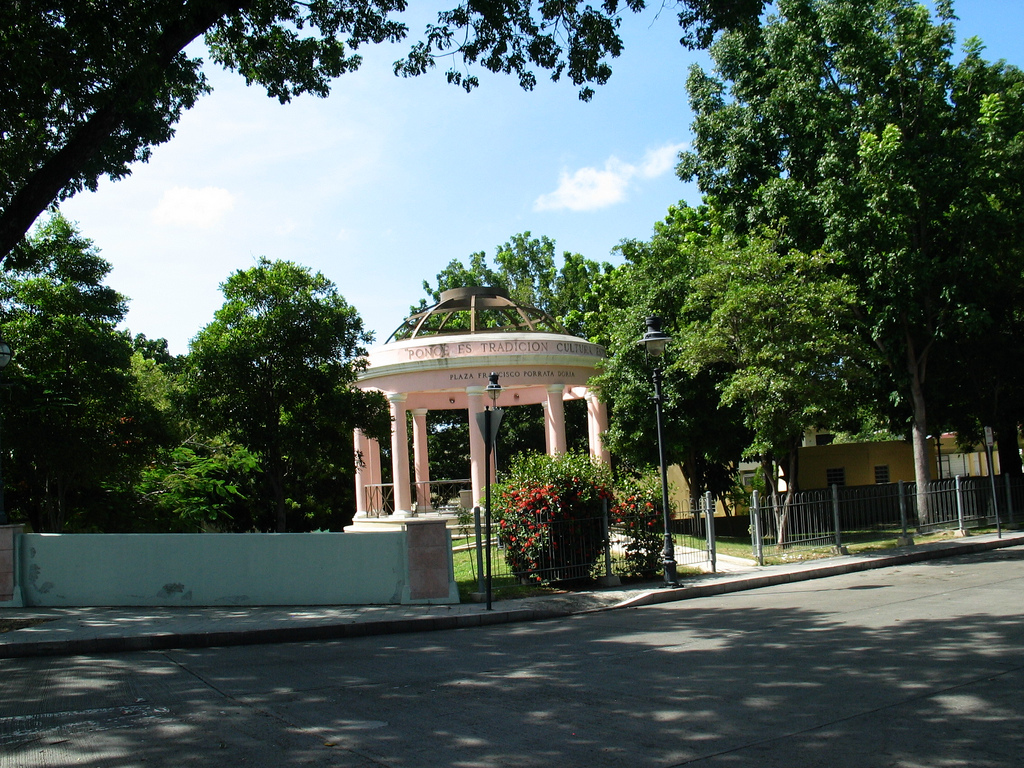
Plaza Francisco Porrata-Doria, at Tricentennial Park, in Barrio Tercero, Ponce, Puerto Rico, built in honor of the architect.

From 1916 to 1935, Porrata-Doria practiced as an engineer and architect in Ponce. During this time, Porrata Doria designed 12 of his 15 churches as well as numerous prestigious homes. Among these churches where those in the towns of Barranquitas, Jayuya, Maunabo, Patillas, Peñuelas, and Villalba.

Among Porrata-Doria's works are Banco Crédito y Ahorro Ponceño, the Ponce Cathedral (whose 1932 façade is Porrata's design), Banco de Ponce, and the Fernando Luis Toro Home. All of these are also listed in the National Register of Historic Places. Also by Porrata-Doria is the Gomez Residence, also listed in the NRHP. Porrata Doria's works are exhibited at the Museum of Puerto Rican Architecture.

He also designed the famed Teatro Fox Delicias (today a hotel), the Hotel Meliá (still in operation), the El Cometa Building (today headquarters of the Ponce Municipal Assembly, next to city hall), the San Lucas Hospital (on Guadalupe street) and the Dr. Pila Clinic (now an apartment building). He also designed the Mario Mercado Castle, atop a hill in Guayanilla. In addition, and also surrounding plaza Las Delicias, Porrata-Doria designed the Forteza Building (previously occupied by the Bella Hess Stores and now home to the PUCPR-School of Architecture) and the Gonzalez Building, long-time home of Farmacias Gonzalez and today a mixed-commercial location.

== Puerto Rico Reconstruction Administration ==
In 1936 Porrata-Doría became project engineer for the Puerto Rico Reconstruction Administration. He was also consulting engineer for the city of Ponce. He participated in the design and rebuilding of Teatro La Perla, the Ponce Public Library, and the Abraham Lincoln and José Celso Barbosa elementary schools.

From 1942 to 1956 he worked as official architect for the engineering division of the Autoridad de Fuentes Fluviales (Pluvial Fountains Authority), today the Autoridad de Energía Eléctrica (Electric Power Authority). During this time he also designed a church in Hato Rey, and the home residence of Antonio S. Luchetti, the director of the Authority. This last one, commissioned by the government of Puerto Rico, caused so much public criticism that the home was sold without Luchetti ever living it.

== Last years and death ==
In 1966, Porrata-Doría left public service and returned to private practice once again. During this second period in the private sector, he designed many luxurious homes, the González y Compañía building across from Parque de Bombas (first a department store, then a drugstore, and now occupied by the Pontifical Catholic University of Puerto Rico School of Architecture), the clinic of Dr. Fernández García and his last two churches. During his last years, Porrata-Doría developed a hobby: he designed homes without any plan or intention to have them built. He died in Ponce on 2 September 1971 at the age of 81, as a result of an "acute myocardial infection." He was buried at Cementerio Católico San Vicente de Paul.

== Memberships, etc. ==
Porrata-Doría was a fervent Catholic. He was also a civic leader, and president of the Ponce School Board. He was a founding member of the Colegio Ponceño de Varones, the Ponce Rotary Club, the Council of the Knights of Columbus, the Casino de Ponce, the Centro Español de Ponce and the Club Deportivo de Ponce.

== Honors ==
His contributions earned him a place at the Tricentennial Park where one of its three plaza is named after him. Porrata-Doría is also honored at Ponce's Park of the Illustrious Ponce Citizens at another plaza within the same park, the "Plaza de los Ponceños Ilustres", for his contributions to the field of architecture.

== See also ==
- List of Puerto Ricans
- Alfredo Wiechers
- Blas Silva
