= Casa Fernando Luis Toro =

Historic house in Ponce, Puerto Rico

- Fernando Luis Toro Casa (Note: The house's name is presented here using word order (name preceding "Casa") that conforms to the usage in the house's National Register announcement of listing and subsequent database entries.)
- U.S. National Register of Historic Places
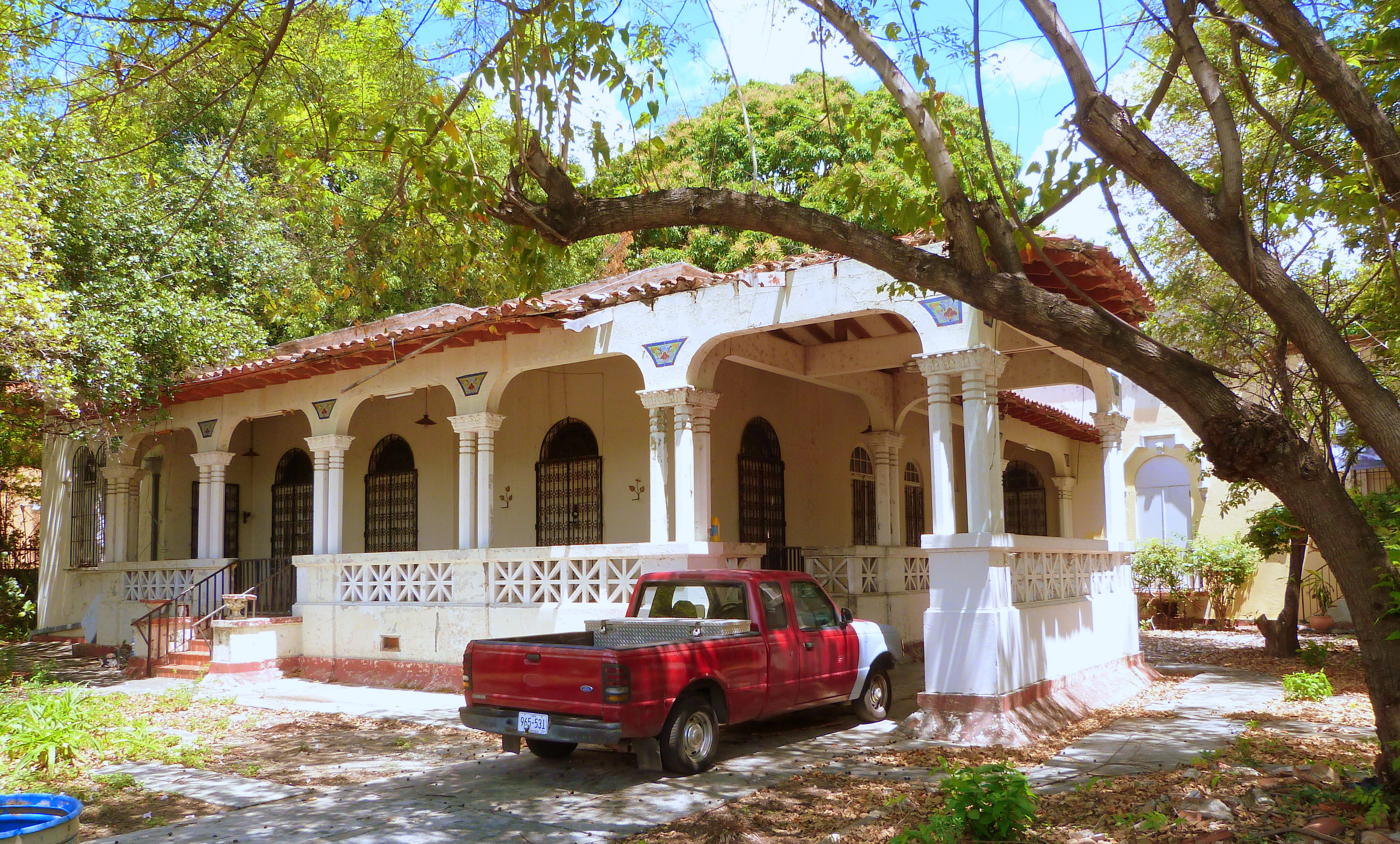
- Casa Fernando Luis Toro in 2017

- Location within Puerto Rico
- Location: La Alhambra Calle Obispado, Number 3, Ponce, Puerto Rico
- Coordinates: 18°01′04″N 66°36′21″W
- Area: 0.5 acres (0.20 ha)
- Built: 1927
- Architect: Francisco Porrata Doria
- NRHP reference No.: 86000421
- Added to NRHP: 5 March 1986

Casa Fernando Luis Toro (English: Fernando Luis Toro Home) is a historic house in Ponce, Puerto Rico. The house is unique in that it is located in the first upper-class suburban development built in Puerto Rico, La Alhambra.

In 1990 La Alhambra was designed as part of Ponce's historic district. The house dates to 1927 and was designed by the famed Puerto Rican architect Francisco Porrata Doria. It was listed in the National Register of Historic Places on 5 March 1986, as Fernando Luis Toro Casa. It is also known as Casa Chavier. The house was sold by its original owners in the early 1970s to Mr. Jorge Chavier and his wife Ms. Hilda de Lis who still occupied the house in 1986.

== History ==
The house was built in 1927. It was designed by Francisco Porrata Doria, a well-known architect from Ponce. The house is located in the La Alhambra sector of the city, a well-to-do area developed in the early twentieth century. La Alhambra was the first upper-class suburban development in Puerto Rico. In 1990, La Alhambra was designated part of the Ponce Historic Zone.

== Architecture ==
The house draws from architectural designs commonly seen in Coral Gables and West Palm Beach, Florida. The house, for example, is located in a large lot, surrounded by presumptuous landscaping. The property is one of three adjoining properties that belong to three wealthy brothers. The three residences are connected in their backyards. An elegant front concrete wall serves as a common fence. The most outstanding feature of the interior is the core location of the living room. While most of the floors are wooden, the terrace and the dining room have mosaic-tiled floors. The kitchen, service hall, and pantry have local tiles of various colors and designs.

== Significance ==
The Toro residence is located in an elegant residential area of Ponce called La Alhambra. This was the first large, upper−class suburban expansion developed in Puerto Rico in the early 1900s. Much in the style of Coral Gables and West Palm Beach in Florida, residences were sited on unusually large lots which allowed for elaborate and formal landscaping.

The combination of eclectic architectural elements displayed in this house makes it one of the better examples of the designs of the locally well-known architect Francisco Porrata Doria. His distinct style was based on the integration of diverse architectural influences such as: Victorian, Georgian, Neo-classic, academic Beaux Arts, Spanish Revival and Catalan modernism (from Catalonia, Spain; land which capital is Barcelona). Architect Porrata Doria is responsible for the design of some of the most important buildings in Ponce, of which the Teatro Fox Delicias and the Banco de Ponce facing the town square, are among his best projects. Significant representations of early 20th−century design concepts implemented in Ponce architecture are the Toro residence's L-shaped balcony, the use of tile, mosaic, stained glass, and the emphasis placed on the dining room within the organizing scheme.

== Physical appearance ==
Constructed of reinforced concrete, the Toro residence was designed and built in 1927 for Mr. Fernando Luis Toro by architect Francisco Porrata Doria, a locally prominent designer. The residence is one of three properties, with connecting patios, belonging to three brothers. The U-shaped floor plan exhibits a perpendicular extension towards the East. Most important to the spatial distribution is the centrally located living room. Off this main space, six composite doors with arched transoms of stained glass lead into adjacent interior corridors on both sides. Two doors lead to the balcony. On the North side of this space, is the most ornamented doorway of Georgian decoration which is flanked by a set of doric pilasters crowned by a cornice. The hung ceiling of the living room is detailed in a pentagonal pattern of thin wooden slats. The North doorway leads into the enclosed terrace whose back wall is angled in four sections. At the intersection of these angles, there is a set of double columns. Colored glass provides the space with diffused light. A high-glazed ceramic tile wainscot of elaborate patterns contains the inscription in Arabic: "God is Allah and Muhammad his only prophet."

On the South end of the West wing is the formal dining room. The main ornaments of this space are a pair of twin windows with arched transoms of stained glass and four deep ceiling wood beams with ornate brackets supporting them at each end. The remainder of the West wing houses the service and semi-public areas of the house such as: the pantry, a breakfast room, the kitchen, a service patio, and the maid's quarters (presently an office). The East extension of the plan contains three bedrooms, two bathrooms, a drawing room, and an office space with a private entrance. Even though most of the house has wooden flooring, the dining room and enclosed terrace have extraordinary mosaic floors. The kitchen, service corridor, and pantry have multi-colored cement tiles of varying patterns.

The exterior, although sober, is elegant. Cast-in-place, bas-relief flower motifs are found on the dining room area exterior facade and general cornice line. Red, curved clay tiles cover the L-shaped balcony and provide the white facade with color. Ten sets of double columns with a shared capital are located on the "maenianum" style balcony railing and act as supports for the balcony roof. Geometrical-shaped head moldings surround all exterior doors and windows for decorative purposes as well as partial weather protection. To the East of the main house there is a formal garden with a fountain located at its center. Four large classical urns provide focal points at diagonal locations to the fountain, and paved, patterned walkways provide varied pedestrian connections between the spaces. Other structures on the site are a coach house or garage, recently turned into an apartment, a cistern tower, and a storage shed.

== See also ==
- Buildings and structures in Ponce, Puerto Rico
- Houses in Puerto Rico
- National Register of Historic Places listings in Ponce, Puerto Rico
