= Hotel Meliá (Puerto Rico) =

Hotel in Ponce, Puerto Rico

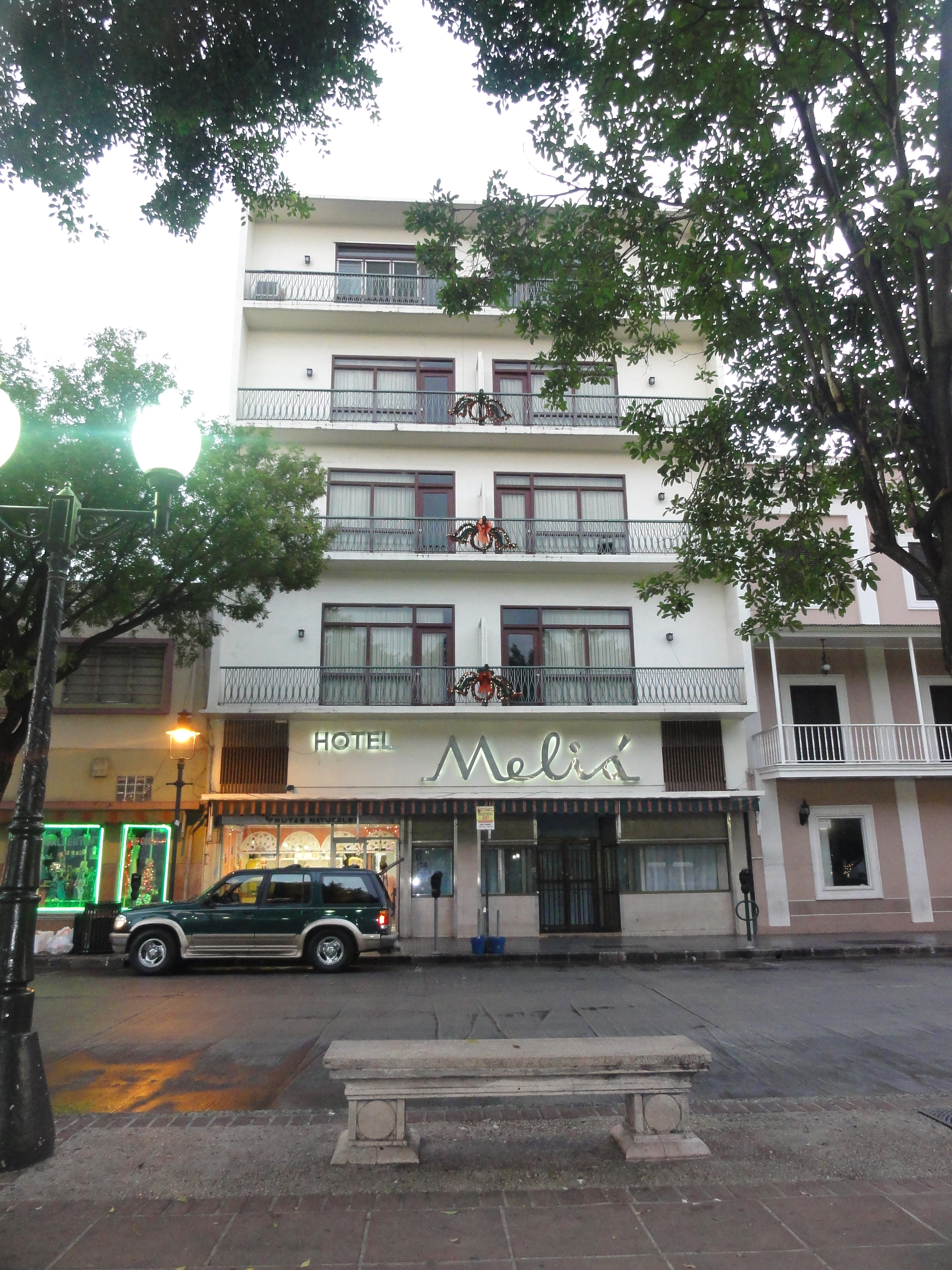
- Hotel Meliá located across the Plaza Degetau in Ponce. Puerto Rico

- Location within Puerto Rico

General information
- Architectural style: Colonial
- Location: Ponce, Puerto Rico, 75 Cristina Street
- Coordinates: 18°0′42.4″N 66°36′47.2″W
- Opening: 1895(Founder: Bartolo Meliá)
- Owner: Current: Prime Holdings Group; Historical: The Meliá family Family-owned and operated since 1895 (DBA Hotel Meliá Inc.)
- Operator: Nicolas Albors Meliá, GM; Raul Albors, Exec. Mgr.

Technical details
- Floor count: 4

Design and construction
- Architects: Alfredo Wiechers Pieretti; Francisco Porrata Doria; Enrique Soler Cloqull

Other information
- Number of rooms: 73
- Number of restaurants: 1 (Panorama)
- Number of bars: 1
- Parking: On site

Website
- Hotel Meliá

Hotel Meliá is a historic colonial style family owned and operated hotel located in the Ponce Historic Zone in Ponce, Puerto Rico. It is the oldest continuously operating hotel in Puerto Rico. Hotel Meliá, which was founded over 60 years before the much larger Meliá Hotels International chain opened its first lodging facility, bears no relation to the multi-hotel chain headquartered in Spain.

== Location ==
The colonial facade of Hotel Meliá is located across from Parque de Bombas in Plaza Las Delicias, in downtown Ponce.

== Design ==
The hotel lobby, with its polished wood paneling, plush seating and marble floors is traditional of the hotel's long-recognized throwback elegance. The hotel has been called "reminiscent of Old World Spain". Hotel Meliá Ponce's design was inspired by a small hotel in Barcelona, Spain. The tile on the second floor is similar to what is oftentimes seen in an Old World Spanish hotel. "The feeling of Europe is evident also in the layout of the property as one level up from the lobby there is an open air area...the architecture is a "unique mix of cultures with the Spanish influence reinvented”.

== History ==
In 1890, Bartolo Meliá moved from Mallorca, Spain, to Ponce to take an accounting job. Once he arrived to Puerto Rico, Meliá discovered that the owners of the business he was to take a job at were in jail. Not discouraged, he settled in Ponce and opened a small grocery store across Plaza Las Delicias. Meliá imported many goods from Europe which established his reputation as a popular grocer in the city. Thanks to his success as a grocer, he expanded his store into a restaurant. Seeing the need for an overnight stay of drivers making their trips from San Juan to Ponce and the convenient location of his grocery-restaurant, he then expanded into a small hotel.

Bartolo Meliá founded the Meliá in 1895. It was originally a two-story structure but was later converted into a four-story building as the hotel business expanded. From very early times the hotel became well known for its attention to personal details, cleanliness, hospitality, service and courtesy. It quickly became a preferred destination for Ponce business travelers. "Mr. Meliá is a prince of hosts, and a man who never grudges at going out of his way to oblige a guest."

Meliá was the first hotel in Puerto Rico to offer a telephone line and a private bathroom in each room. As the business grew, so did the hotel. It saw major expansions in 1915, 1940 and 1960. The original hotel faced Plaza Las Delicias, but in 1915 Alfredo Wiechers Pieretti redesigned it to have its entrance on Calle Cristina, increasing the number of its rooms from nine to 21. In 1940, Francisco Porrata Doria added 26 new rooms bringing the total number of rooms to 47. In 1960, 26 additional rooms yet were added by Enrique Soler Cloquell bringing the total to the actual number of 73 rooms.

== Management ==
Since 1895, the hotel had been in the Melia family for four generations, doing business under the corporate name Hotel Melia, Inc., but in July 2013, the hotel was bought by Prime Holdings Group, a Ponce investment group headed by Abel Misla, the dean of the Pontificia Universidad Catolica de Puerto Rico School of Architecture. The new owners plan to redesign the hotel to give it a more 19th-century Spanish-themed, boutique hotel.

== Trademark dispute ==
In late 2008, Hotel Meliá, Inc (HMI) filed a complaint against Sol Meliá in the Court of First Instance after the Spanish company attempted to register the name "Meliá" with the Puerto Rico Department of State asserting that Hotel Meliá Inc "had the sole right to use the Meliá mark in connection with hotel and restaurant services throughout Puerto Rico". As a result, Sol Meliá withdrew its application. But S.L. Dorpan, a wholly owned subsidiary of Sol Meliá, subsequently filed a complaint against HMI in the United States District Court for the District of Puerto Rico, "seeking a declaration that under the Lanham Act, Dorpan had the right to use the mark Meliá throughout Puerto Rico" and that HMI had the right to use the name Meliá only in the city of Ponce. The District Court then ruled in favor of Sol Meliá. HMI then appealed the decision of the US District Court for the District of Puerto Rico to the First Circuit Court of Appeals in Boston. On 28 August 2013, the Court of Appeals issued its opinion vacating the lower district court's decision and ruling in favor of Ponce's HMI.

== Guests ==
Several prominent figures have been guests at the Meliá, including Libertad Lamarque, María Antonieta Pons, Yolanda "Tongolele" Montes and Ninón Sevilla, as well as Pedro Albizu Campos. U.S. President Theodore Roosevelt was also a guest at this hotel.

== See also ==
- History of the Autonomous Municipality of Ponce
- List of hotels in Ponce, Puerto Rico
