= Teatro Fox Delicias =

Historic building in the city of Ponce, Puerto Rico

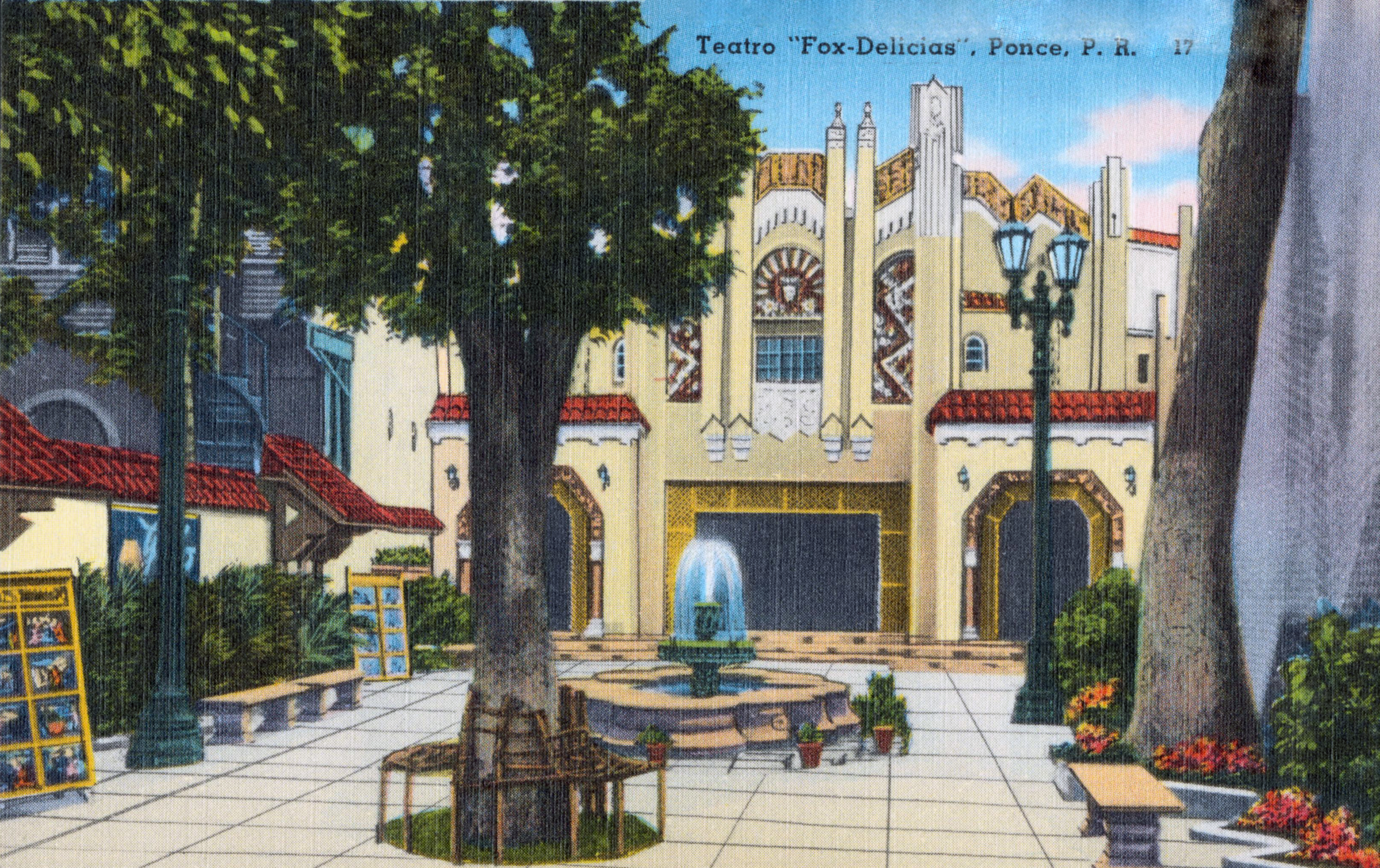
- Teatro Fox Delicias
- Interactive map of Teatro Fox Delicias
- Address: 6963 Isabel Street
- Location: Ponce, Puerto Rico
- Coordinates: 18.0128°N 66.6142°W
- Owner: Pedro Juan Serrallés (1928-1989); Ruberte Family (1990-2017); Misla Hospitality Group (2018-present)
- Type: Theater (1931-1980); Mall (1991-1998); Hotel (2004-ca. 2010); Today: Pop Art Hotel (2019-present)

Construction
- Built: 1920s
- Opened: 1931 (as "Teatro Delicias")
- Renovated: 1990 (into "Fox Delicias Mall"); 2003 (into "Fox Delicias Hotel"); 2019 (into "The Fox Hotel")
- Closed: 1980
- Cost: $3M (1990 renovation into a mall) $2.8M (2019 renovation into “The Fox Hotel”)
- Architects: Francisco Porrata Doria (theater design); Axel Bonilla (mall design)

Website
- The Fox Hotel

Teatro Fox Delicias is a historic building in the city of Ponce, Puerto Rico. Inaugurated in 1931, it originally housed a movie house until 1980, from 1991 to 1998 it housed a shopping mall, and starting in 2004 it housed a boutique hotel. Its architecture is Art Deco. Originally called Teatro Delicias, it was renamed Fox Delicias many years after its inauguration based on a contract with 20th Century Fox.

== Location ==
The historic structure is located across the historic Plaza Las Delicias in the heart of the Ponce Historic Zone. Its location just north of Plaza Las Delicias makes it part of barrio Segundo.

== Design ==
The building was designed by Francisco Porrata-Doria, who also designed Hotel Melia, Banco de Ponce and many other structures in Puerto Rico. The building bears an Art Deco architectural structure with an impressive multi-level front facade.

== History ==
=== Theater ===
The theater had its origins in the late 1920s when Pedro Juan Serralles purchased a piece of land in the center of the city to build the first movie theater in Ponce. The structure was completed in 1931. The owners contracted with Twentieth Century Fox for showing the movies. Given the movie contract and the location of the theater, it was named Teatro Fox Delicias. It closed its doors as a movie theater in 1980.

=== Mall ===
After serving Ponce moviegoers for some five decades, the building was sold to the Ruberté family. In 1989 the theater was converted into a mall under the design of architect Axel Bonilla. It was named the Fox Delicias Mall. The new mall opened in March, 1991. It had 26 commercial spaces ranging from 300 square feet (28 m^{2}) to 1,200 square feet (110 m^{2}). It also had a cafe-theater. The total space was 30,000 square feet (2,800 m^{2}). Its president is Eduardo Ruberte Huertas. Its renovation lasted a year and cost $3 million.

=== Hotel ===
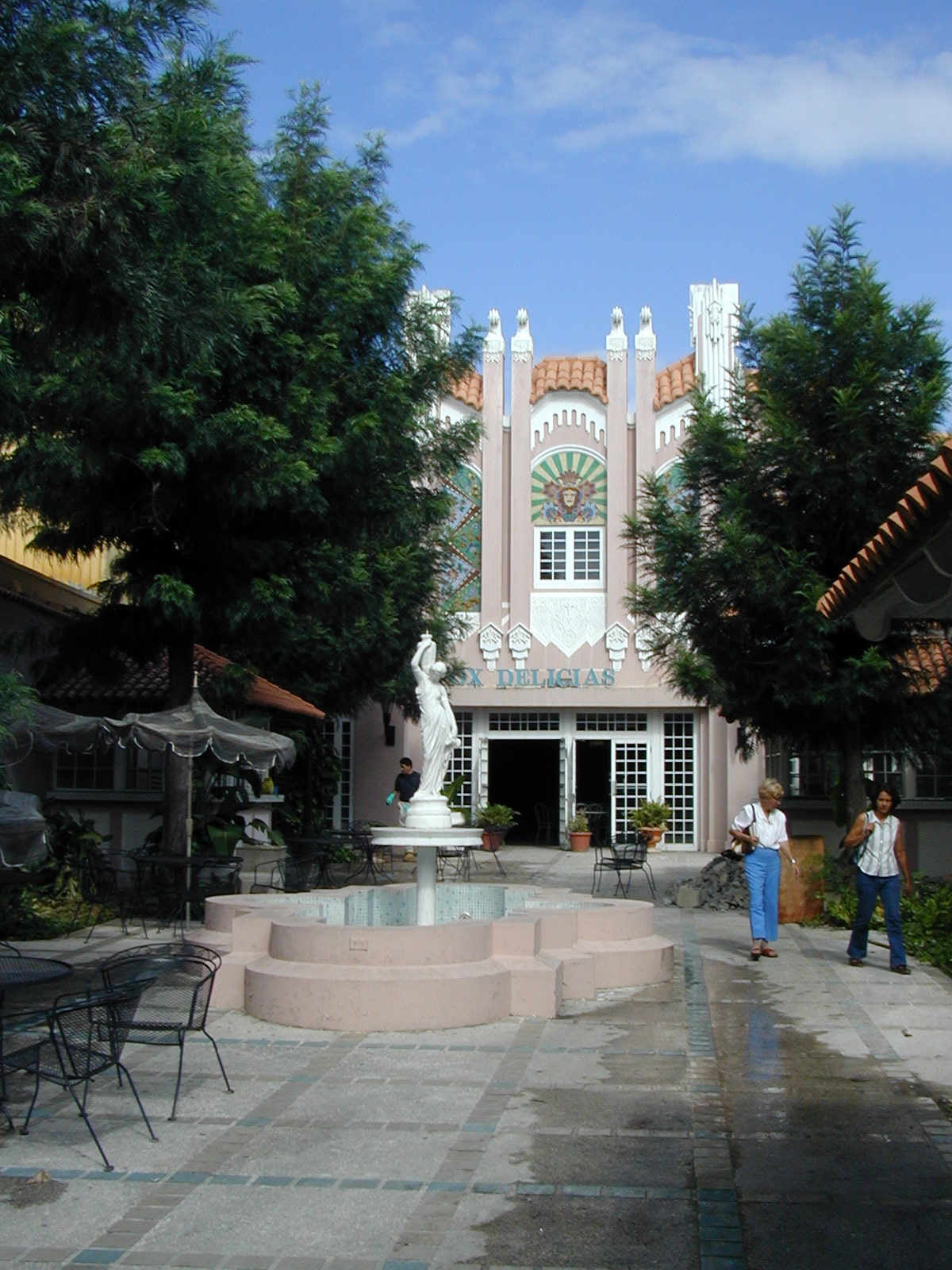
Teatro Fox Delicias redeveloped as a hotel

In 2004 the building started conversion into a hotel. The boutique hotel had 30 rooms. The new hotel opened in 2004. While it operated as a hotel, the structure continued to experience a flow of non-resident tourists. It closed around 2010 and in 2018, Grupo Misla Villalba, a group of local investors, acquired the property and it's currently under remodelation to reopen as a Pop Art themed hotel named “The Fox Hotel”. The hotel reopened on 4 December 2019.

== Other area theaters ==
After Teatro Fox Delicias, a number of theaters opened throughout the city, most of which became known for their architecture. Among these were

- Teatro Victoria, an Art Deco structure, located just three blocks north of Teatro Fox Delicias at Calle Union and Calle Victoria
- Teatro Rivoli, also an Art Deco structure, located only two blocks from Teatro Fox Delicias at Calle Leon and Calle Sol in Barrio Quinto. Architect: Alfredo Wiechers Pieretti.
- Teatro Broadway, a Spanish colonial revival building three blocks west of Teatro Fox Delicias at Calle Mayor Cantera, between Calle Isabel and Calle Sol (building demolished in the 1960s)
- Teatro National, a structure of modern design some six blocks southeast of Teatro Fox Delicias, in the northern edge of the Belgica sector, Barrio Cuarto on Calle Comercio and Calle Venezuela
- Teatro Belgica, an Art Deco structure some eight blocks southeast of Teatro Fox Delicias, in the heart of the Belgica sector, Barrio Cuarto, on Calle Colombia and Calle Gran Via
- Teatro Hollywood, another Art Deco building, some eight blocks southwest of Teatro Fox Delicias, in Barrio Primero en la Calle Villa esq. Calle Esperanza
- Teatro Universal, another Art Deco structure yet located some eight blocks west of Teatro Fox Delicias, on Calle Progreso and Calle Vives
- Teatro Rex, an Art Deco building, located northeast of Teatro Fox Delicias, in the Cantera sector of Barrio Sexto on Calle Mayor Cantera and Calle Acueducto
- Teatro Argel, and Art Deco structure, located west of Teatro Fox Delicias, in the Clausells sector of Barrio Segundo, on Calle Victoria and Calle Fogos
- Teatro Miramar, in Barrio Playa, on Calle Salmon and Calle Alfonso XII, facing the Caribbean Sea

== See also ==
- List of hotels in Puerto Rico
- List of theaters in Ponce, Puerto Rico
