= Gómez Residence =

Historic house in Mayagüez, Puerto Rico

- Gomez Residencia (Note: The house's name is presented here using word order that conforms to the usage in the house's National Register announcement of listing and subsequent database entries. The accent is omitted from "Gómez" in conformance with both of those sources as well as the house's National Register nomination form.)
- U.S. National Register of Historic Places
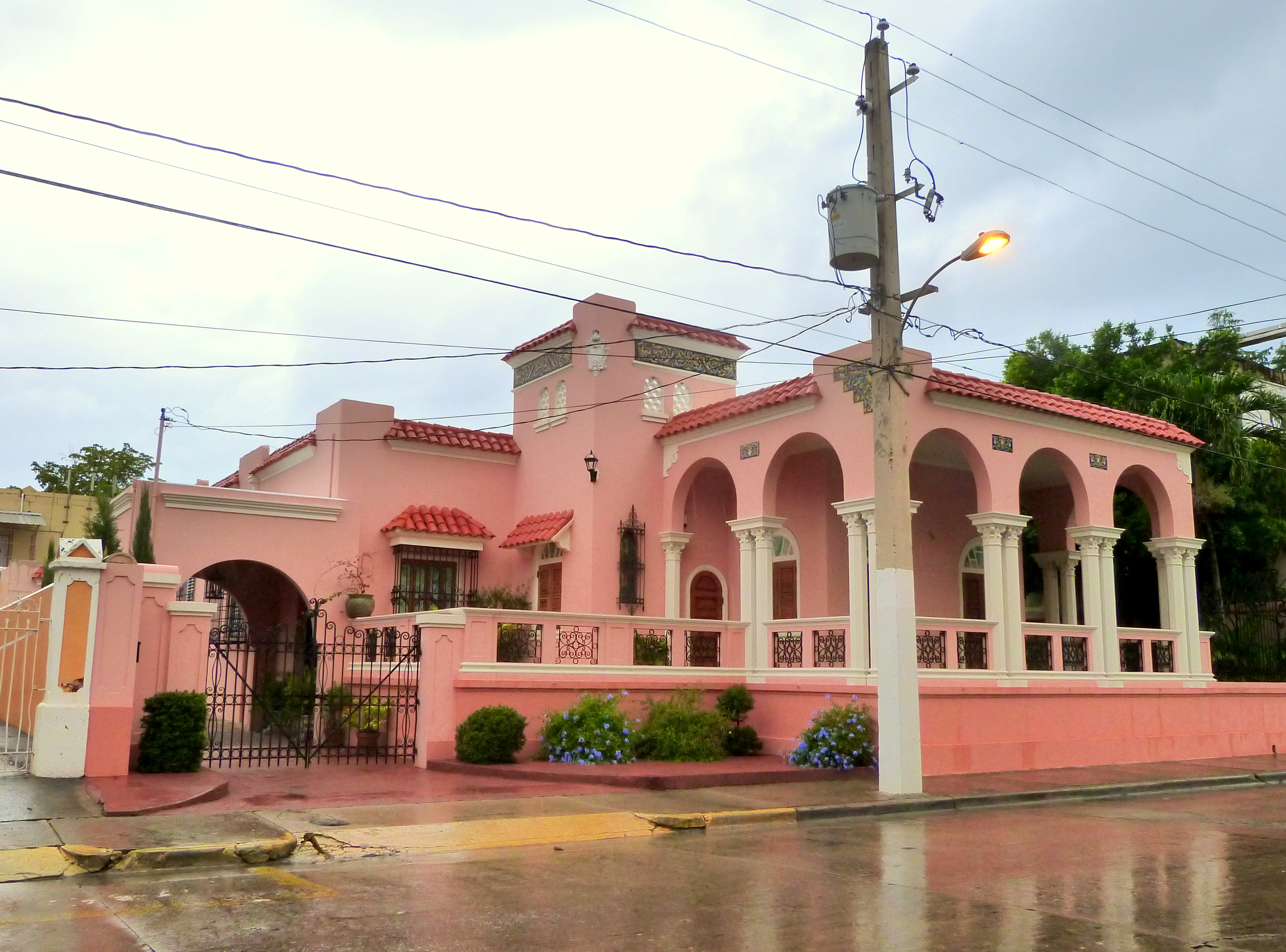
- The Gómez Residence in 2017

- Location within Puerto Rico
- Location: 60 Méndez Vigo Street; Mayagüez, Puerto Rico
- Coordinates: 18°12′09″N 67°08′37″W
- Area: 999 m^{2} (10,750 sq ft)
- Built: 1933
- Architect: Francisco Porrata-Doría
- Architectural style: Spanish Colonial Revival, Moorish Revival
- NRHP reference No.: 88000656
- Added to NRHP: June 15, 1988

The Gómez Residence (Spanish: Residencia Gómez) is a historic house in Mayagüez, Puerto Rico. It was designed by architect Francisco Porrata-Doría in a Mission/Spanish Revival, neo-Andalusí style, and was built in 1933.

It was added to the U.S. National Register of Historic Places in 1988.

== See also ==
- National Register of Historic Places listings in Mayagüez, Puerto Rico
