= Plaza Las Delicias =

Public square in Ponce, Puerto Rico

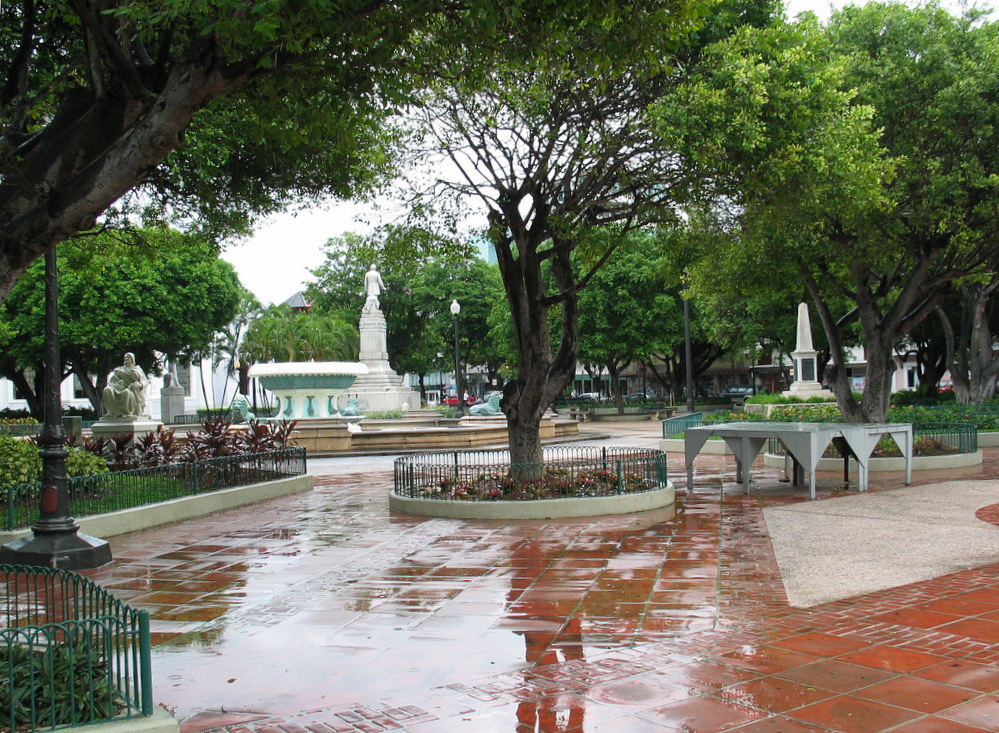
- Plaza Degetau, one of two main plazas at Plaza Las Delicias

- Location within Puerto Rico
- Type: Municipal Plaza and Urban park
- Location: Ponce, Puerto Rico
- Coordinates: 18°00′41.69″N 66°36′50.22″W
- Area: 2.2 acres (0.89 ha)
- Created: 1670
- Operator: Autonomous Municipality of Ponce
- Visitors: over 200,000
- Status: Opened all year, 24 hours/day

Plaza Las Delicias is the main plaza in the city of Ponce, Puerto Rico. The square is notable for its fountains and for the various monuments it contains. The historic Parque de Bombas and Ponce Cathedral buildings are located within the plaza, which actually consists of two squares: Plaza Muñoz Rivera on the north end, and Plaza Degetau on the southern end. The square is the center of the Ponce Historic Zone, and it is flanked by the historic Ponce City Hall to the south, the early 19th-century Teatro Fox Delicias to the north, the NRHP-listed Banco Crédito y Ahorro Ponceño and Banco de Ponce buildings to the east, and the Armstrong-Poventud Residence to the west. The square dates back to the early Spanish settlement in Ponce of 1670. It is the main tourist attraction of the city, receiving about a quarter of a million visitors per year.

== History ==
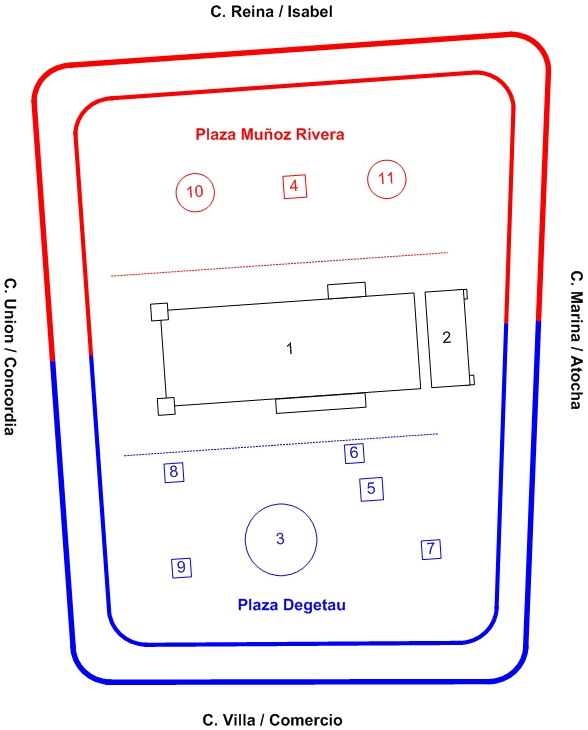
Diagram of Plaza Las Delicias. The upper (north/red) section is the Plaza Luis Muñoz Rivera while the lower (south/blue) section is the Plaza Federico Degetau. Legend: 1. Cathedral Nuestra Señora de la Guadalupe; 2. Parque de Bombas; 3. Lions Fountain; 4. Statue of Luis Muñoz Rivera; 5. Statue of Juan Morel Campos; 6. Statue of Domingo Cruz "Cocolia"; 7. Obelisk to "El Polvorin" Firemen; 8. Statue of Blind Justice; 9. Statue of woman with children, "Añoranzas"; 10 & 11. Large Fountains

External audio
- You may see a video of Plaza Las Delicias HERE

According to the traditional Spanish colonial custom, a town's main square, or plaza, was the center of the town. In the case of Ponce, a Catholic church was built on the center of the plaza, thus splitting the plaza into two sections. The Plaza Las Delicias square is, thus, actually made up of two plazas. The north section of the square is named Plaza Luis Muñoz Rivera (Luis Muñoz Rivera square), while the south section is called Plaza Federico Degetau (Federico Degetau square). Plaza Las Delicias measures 8,800 square meters.

The history of Plaza Las Delicias dates back to as far as the creation of the first Catholic chapel in Ponce in 1670. It is also known that around 1840 Mayor Salvador de Vives planted trees as a renovation project for Plaza Las Delicias. It was first lit in 1864.

In addition to the cathedral and the firehouse, Plaza Las Delicias at one point also contained an open dining Moorish-style Arab kiosk that had been part of the 1882 Fair Exposition. The kiosk was still present at the time of the American invasion of the island in 1898 as reported by American photo-journalist William Dinwiddie, but it was demolished in 1914.

== Plaza Luis Muñoz Rivera ==
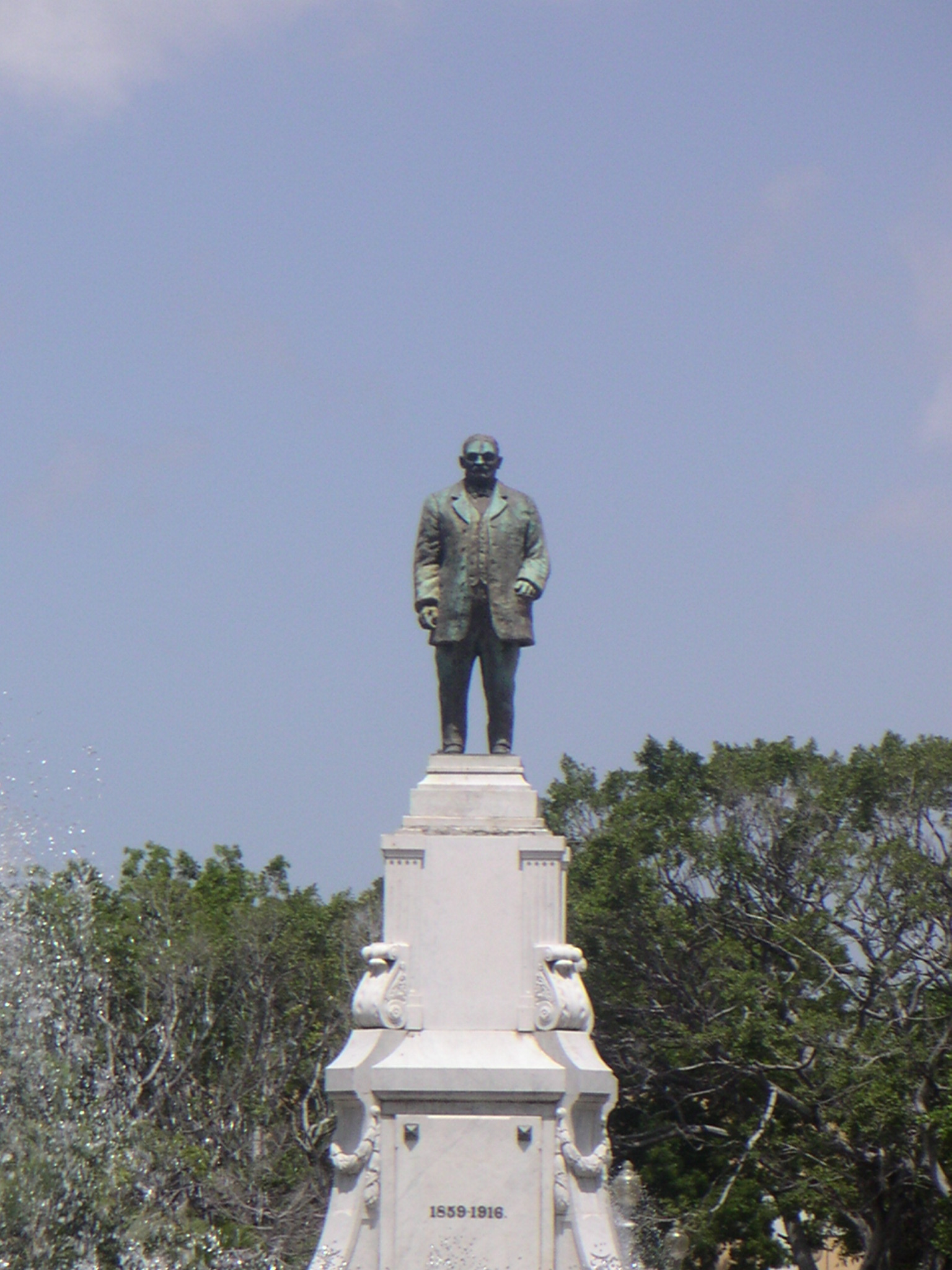
The Statue of Luis Muñoz Rivera is the centerpiece of Plaza Muñoz Rivera

Plaza Luis Muñoz Rivera is the smaller of the two plazas. It is situated to the north of the Ponce Cathedral, and was originally known as Paseo de La Alameda, and was at a time also called "Plaza Las Delicias" itself, but today it is known as Plaza Luis Muñoz Rivera. It is so named to honor the prominent poet, journalist, and politician by that name born in Barranquitas and whose statue stands prominently in the center of this plaza. The statue is the product of the foundry of Italian sculptor Luiggi Tomassi. in Pietrasanta, Italy. The Muñoz Rivera statue is made in bronze and was unveiled in 1923. Luis Yordán Dávila, mayor of Ponce at the time, was one of the main proponents of the monument. In addition to the statue of Munoz Rivera, this section of Plaza Las Delicias also has two fountains.

Plaza Muñoz Rivera is bounded on the north by Plaza Muñoz Rivera street (also called Reina street and Isabel street), on the west by Union street, on the east by Atocha street, and on the south by the Ponce Cathedral and Parque de Bombas. Two hotels, various banks, several boutiques, a five-story drugstore building (now home to the Pontifical Catholic University of Puerto Rico School of Architecture), and the historic Fox Delicias theater surround this smaller plaza.

== Plaza Federico Degetau ==
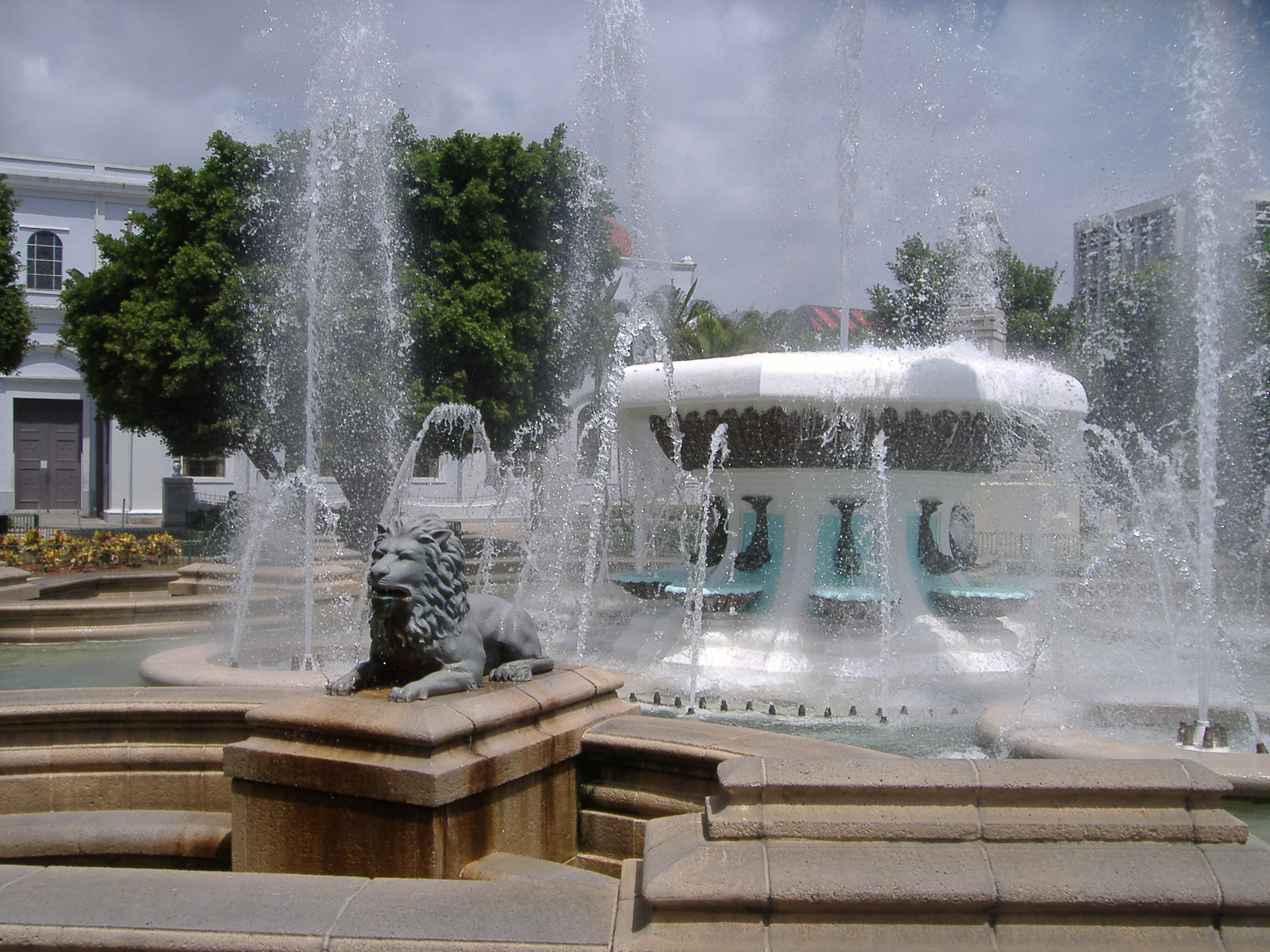
The Lions Fountain on Plaza Degetau

Plaza Federico Degetau is the larger of the two plazas. It was designed by architect Francisco Porrata-Doria in 1914. It is located south of the cathedral and the firehouse. It was originally called Antigua Plaza Real (Old Royal Plaza). This section of Plaza Las Delicias is perhaps the best known and the one most often seen in pictures.

In the center of this plaza lies the famous Fuente de los Leones (Lions Fountain). The large, round-shaped fountain is bounded by a low, marmol and granite wall. The fountain's wall boundary is shaped in the form of a regular octagon and built so that one of the vertices of the octagon points towards the historic Ponce City Hall. The fountain also features four lion statues and water that flows under colored lighting effects. The four lion statues are located one statue on each alternating vertex of the fountain's octagonal boundary wall. The fountain was purchased in 1939 at the New York World's Fair. The fountain, including a mechanical basement, was remodeled and restored in 1993. Its base was enlarged and a computerized lighting system was installed.

This plaza also features a statue of native composer, Juan Morel Campos. This statue was also produced at the workshop of Italian sculptor Luiggi Tomassi Also in this plaza is an obelisk in honor of the firefighters that fought in the "Polvorín" fire (See Monumento a los heroes de El Polvorín). The obelisk was unveiled in 1948, in time for the 50th anniversary of the frightful fire. There is also a statue, called Blind Justice of a woman on a long dress with her eyes covered by a cloth wrapped around the top of her head. The woman's left hand holds a sword inside a shaft resting on the ground and there are two children sitting happily by her feet: one is embracing the lower part of the shaft, the other is playing with an orange tree branch.

Plaza Degetau is bounded on the north by the Our Lady of Guadalupe Cathedral and Parque de Bombas, on the south by Plaza Degetau street (also called Villa street and Comercio street), on the west by Union street, and on the east by Atocha street. It is surrounded by two hotels, the Ponce City Hall, two banks (historic Banco de Ponce and historic Banco Crédito), a long-standing ice cream parlor called "King's Cream", and various boutiques and cafes.

== Setting ==
The Plaza has wide mosaic-tile sidewalks, well-manicured flower gardens, well-trimmed bushes and Indian laurel trees, late 1800s lampposts, and numerous marble benches. It is home to the Lions Fountain, "one of the most beautiful fountains in Puerto Rico." The fountain is made of marble and bronze.

It is surrounded by a multitude of historic sites: Paseo Atocha, Old Fox Delicias Theater, and Callejon Amor (Love Alley), among others. During the day, the plaza hustles with schoolchildren, shoppers, and tourists. After the sun sets, there are often live bands giving concerts to "multigenerational families."

== Venue ==
The square is the site of numerous cultural celebrations. Among these are Carnaval Ponceño, Las Mañanitas and Fiestas Patronales. Many musical events related to the Las Justas sporting event also take place here.

== Gallery ==
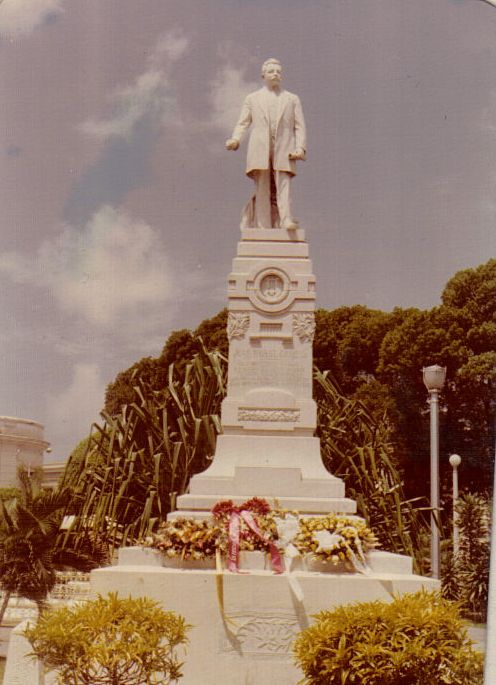
Statue of Juan Morel Campos at Plaza Degetau, in 1977

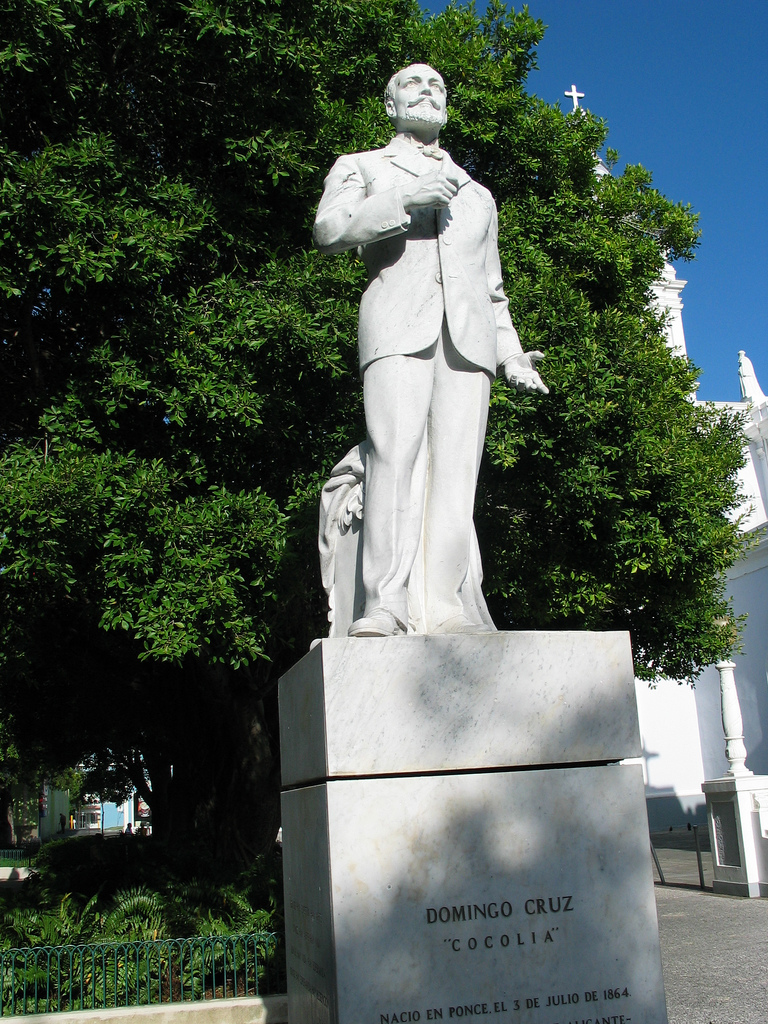
Statue of Domingo Cruz "Cocolia" at Plaza Degetau, in 2010

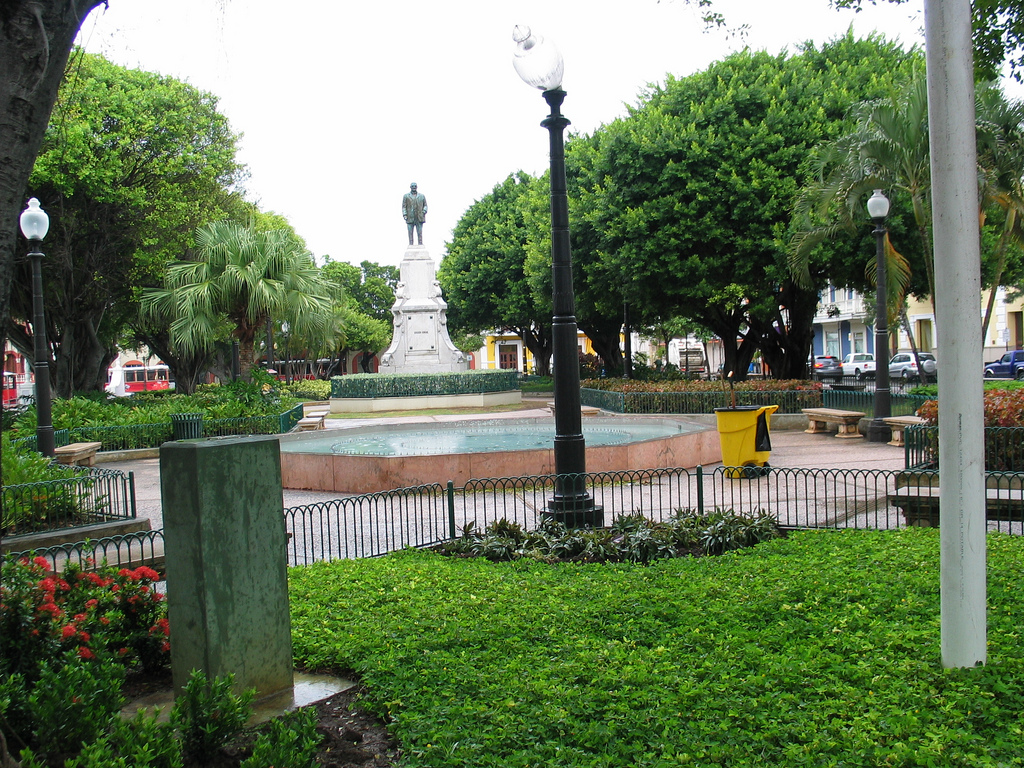
Plaza Muñoz Rivera, looking west, in 2010

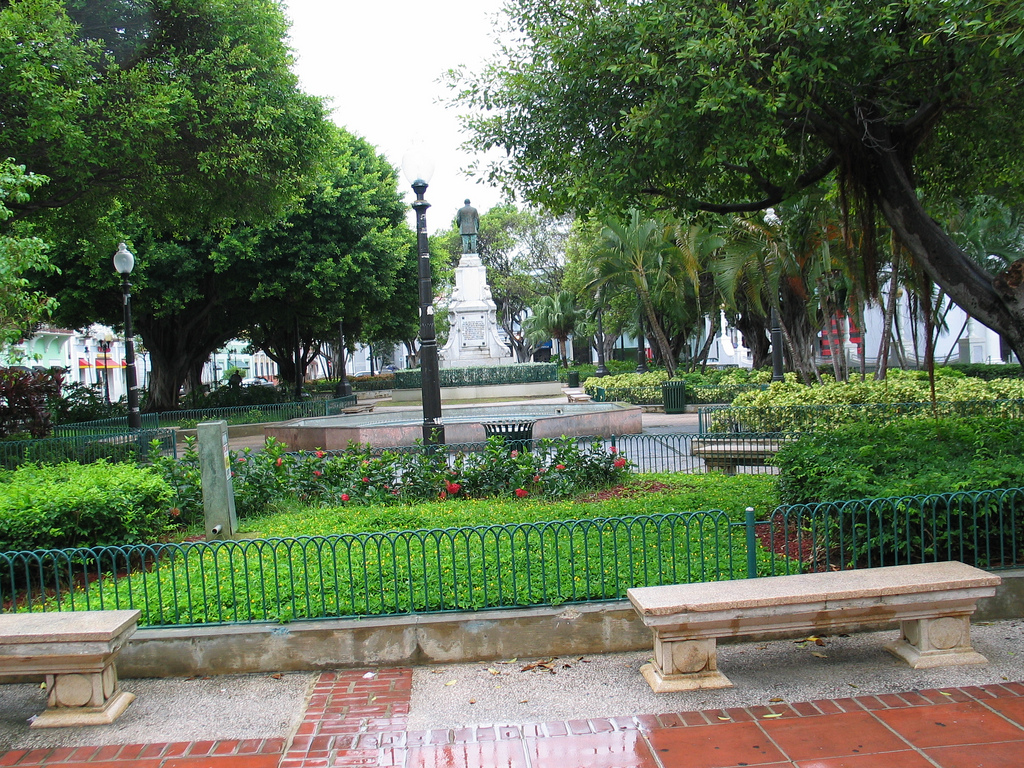
Plaza Muñoz Rivera, looking east, in 2010

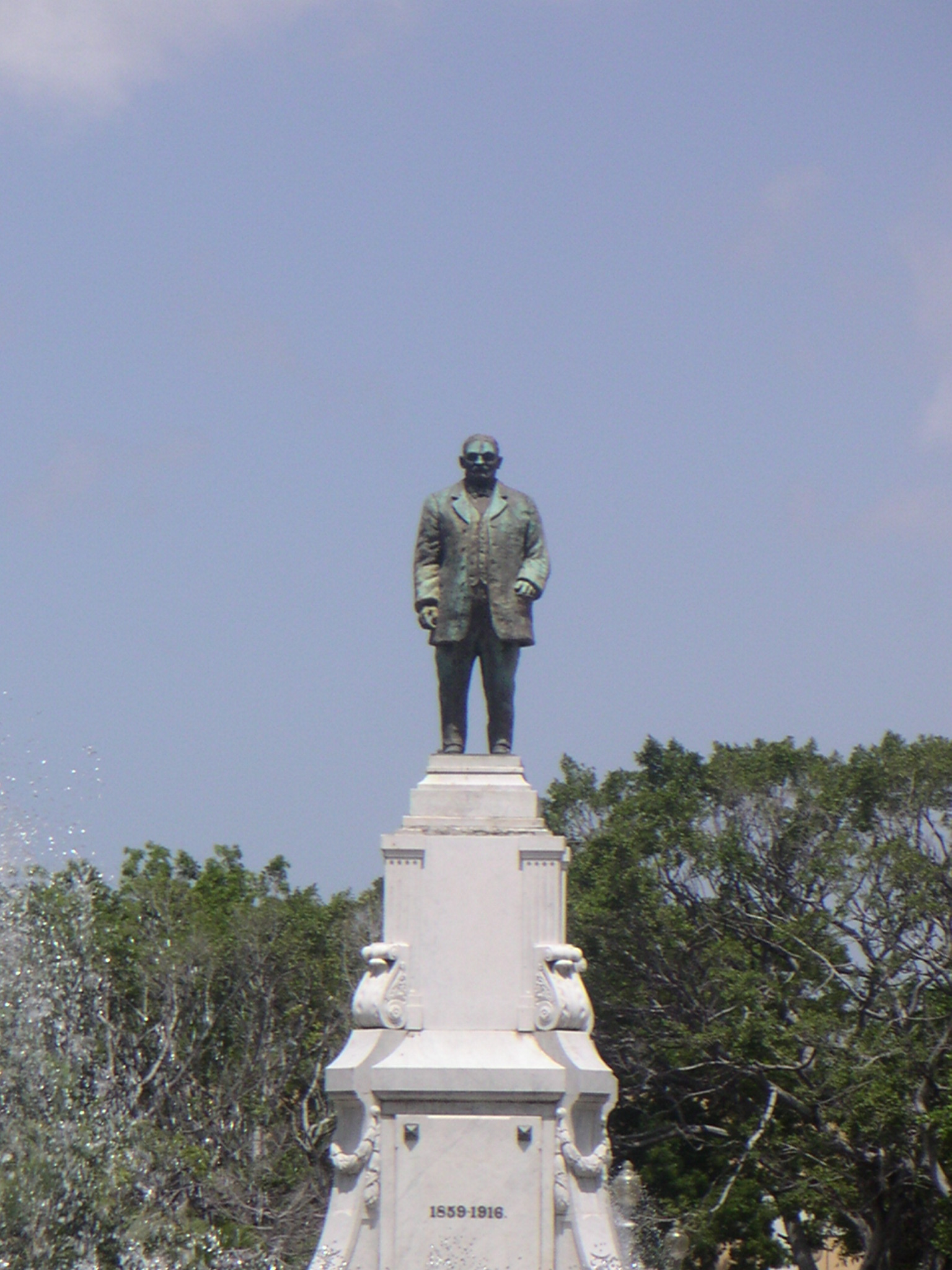
Statue of Luis Muñoz Rivera at Plaza Muñoz Rivera, in 2005

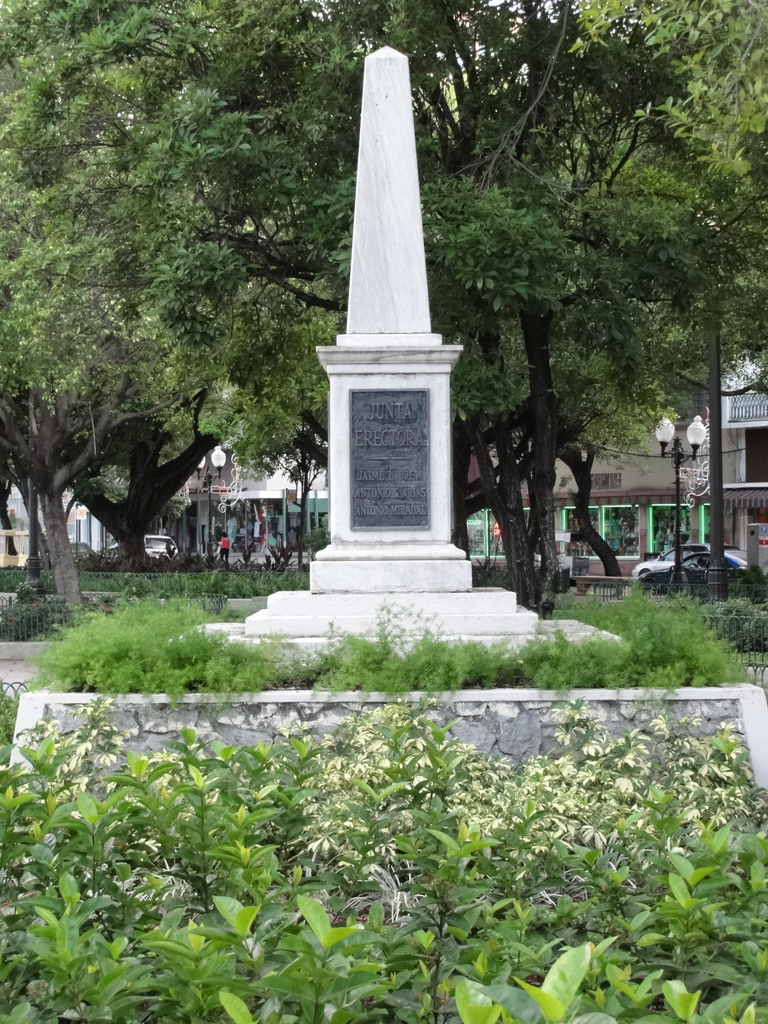
Obelisk to El Polvorin firefighters in Plaza Degetau, in 2010

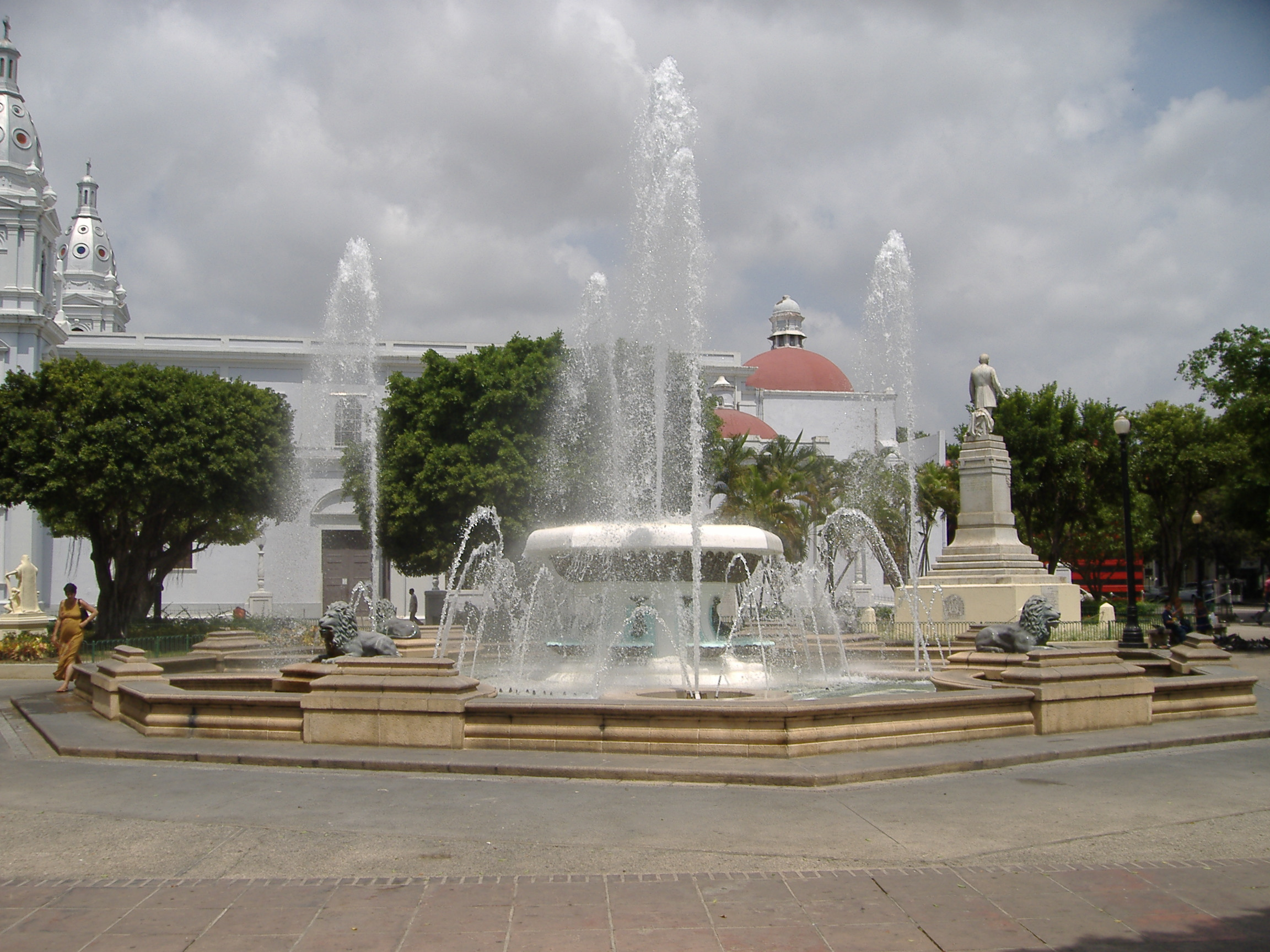
Fountain of Lions on Plaza Degetau, ca. 1980

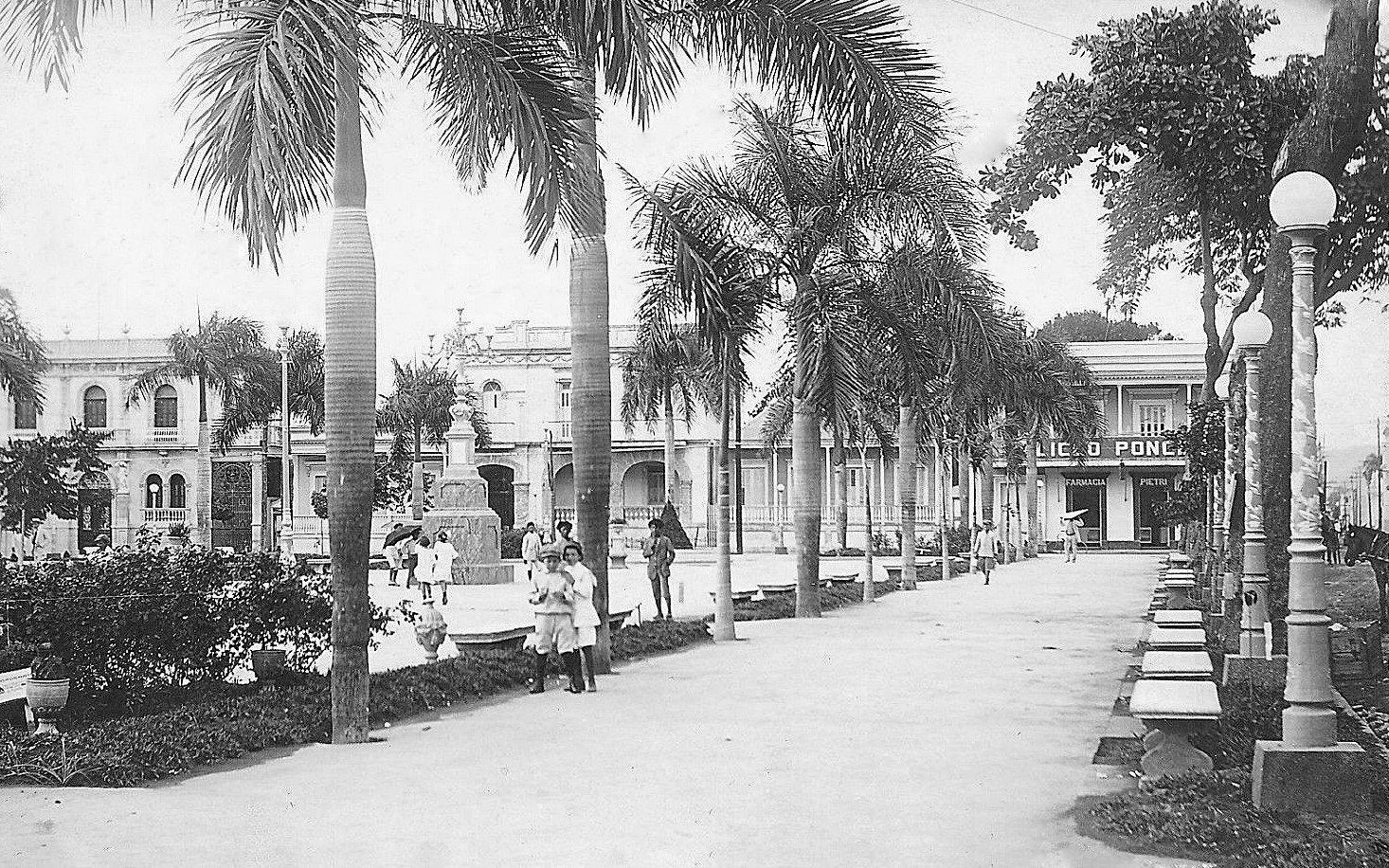
Plaza de Ponce (1917)
