= Banco Crédito y Ahorro Ponceño (building) =

Historic building in Puerto Rico

- U.S. National Register of Historic Places
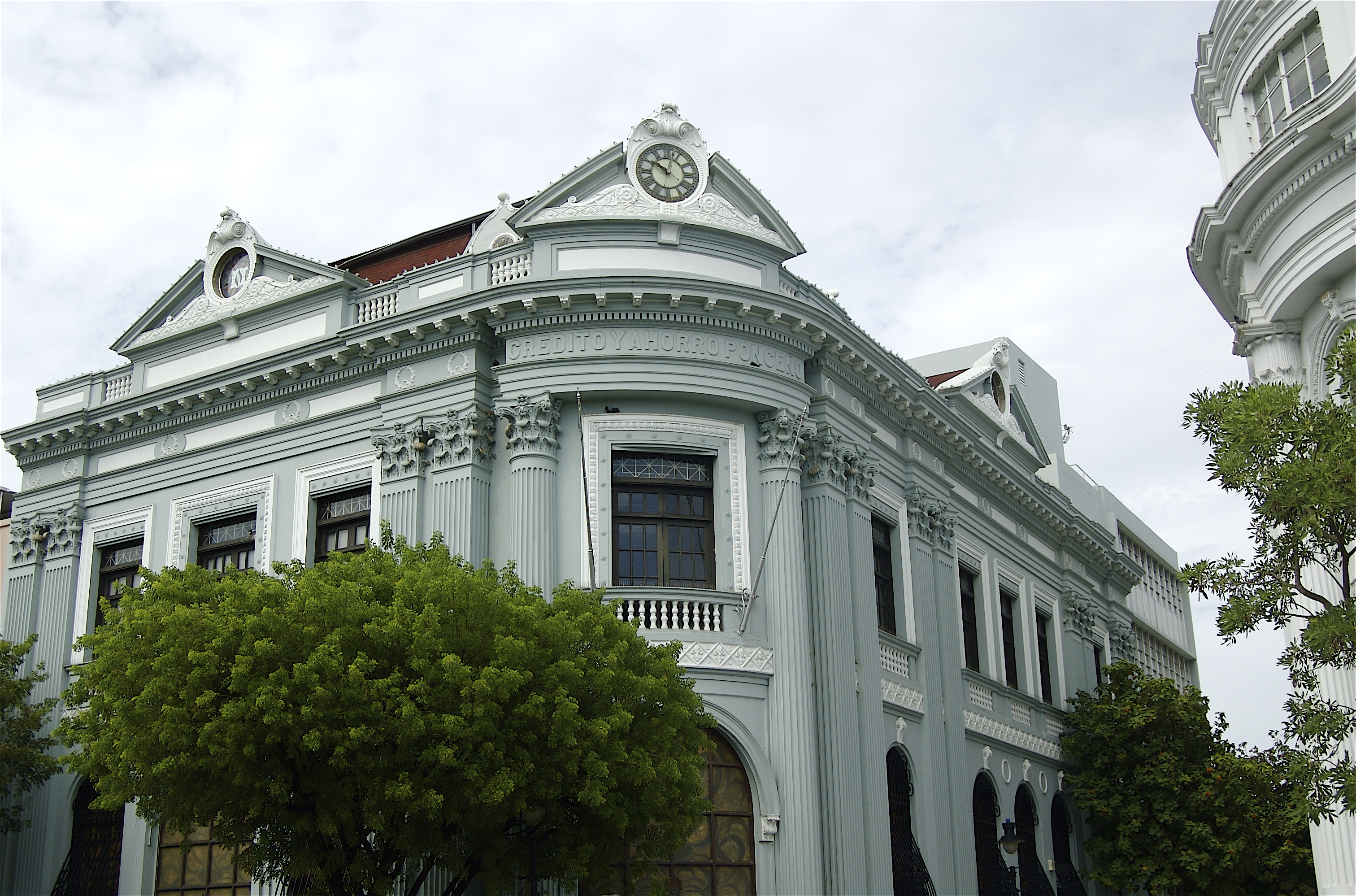
- The Banco Crédito y Ahorro Ponceño building on Plaza Degetau

- Location within Puerto Rico
- Location: Plaza Degetau; Ponce, Puerto Rico
- Coordinates: 18°00′41″N 66°36′48″W
- Area: less than one acre
- Built: 1924
- Architect: Francisco Porrata-Doria
- Architectural style: Beaux-Arts
- NRHP reference No.: 87001002
- Added to NRHP: June 25, 1987

The Banco Crédito y Ahorro Ponceño building (or Banco Crédito, for short), a historic building in Ponce, Puerto Rico, was the first and main office of the historic Banco Crédito y Ahorro Ponceño (English: Ponce Credit and Savings Bank), and represents one of the last examples of the once popular turn-of-the-century eclectic architecture. The building was listed on the U.S. National Register of Historic Places on June 25, 1987. It was built in 1924. The building was owned by Banco Crédito y Ahorro Ponceño which was one of the largest banking companies in the country of Puerto Rico during most of the twentieth century.

== Location ==
The building is located on Calle Marina (Marina Street) and Calle Amor (Amor Street, now "Paseo Arias" (Arias Promenade), facing west across Plaza Degetau. It is bounded on the east by Calle Mayor (Mayor Street). Amor Street was also called Callejon Amor (Amor Alley), literally, Love Alley. In 1991, Amor Street was converted into a promenade and renamed Paseo Antonio S. Arias Ventura, after the long-time employee of Banco Crédito y Ahorro Ponceño who started as a custodian and rose to become the bank's general manager.

== History and Significance ==
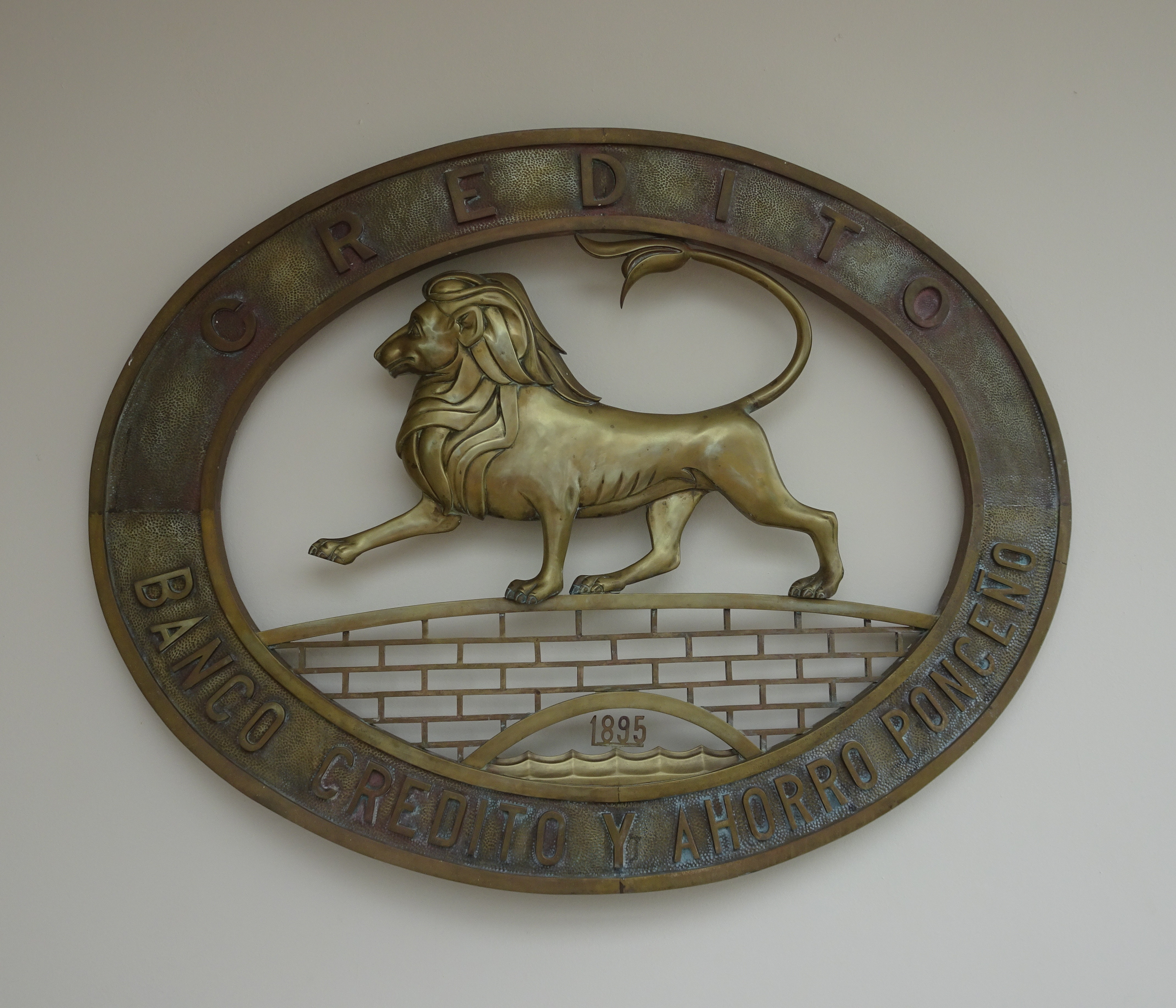
Plaque from the Banco Crédito building, now on display at Museo de la Historia de Ponce

Built in 1924 as the main office for the expanding Banco Crédito y Ahorro Ponceño bank this building represents one of the last examples of the once popular turn-of-the-century eclectic architecture so common in Ponce after the 1918 earthquake. Banco Crédito was designed and built by Francisco Porrata-Doria, who at the time had recently returned to Puerto Rico after studying engineering at Cornell University and architectural courses at Columbia University. Porrata Doria was one of the island's finest architects, a pioneer in the development of a local modern architecture, and one of the architects responsible for what can be called "Ponce Monumental Architecture", of which Banco Crédito is a good example. Among the directors and officers of this prominent bank were some of the most recognized names in the city of Ponce and Puerto Rico at large, including former Ponce mayor, Ulpiano Colóm.

This building together with the one next door it, Banco de Ponce, exemplify the effort of local financial institutions to compete with US-based banks for the wealth of Puerto Rico's booming sugar economy.

Banco Crédito's monumental exuberance expresses the pride of the institution, its solidity, and its capacity to hold its own against far more wealthy Stateside institutions competing for the dollars of the local moneyed classes.

The Banco Crédito y Ahorro Ponceños setting on the city's main square contributes to the elegance of this part of the city. Several adjacent structures are already listed in the National Register, including the old Firehouse (1883) the City Hall (1845) and the Cathedral (1841). The latter's facade is a 1932 Porrata-Doria design.

== Architecture ==
The building's architect was Francisco Porrata-Doria. It is a two-story masonry and concrete building located near the southeastern end of Ponce's main square. It sits on a corner lot, looking southwestward towards the main street, Plaza Degetau (Calle Atocha).

It is a single, compact volume which wraps itself around the corner in a dramatic curve that corresponds to the chamfered corner required since the late 19th century by city ordinances. The main two levels have nearly twenty-feet-high ceilings, thus giving the structure sufficient bulk so as to stand out within its context. Verticality is accented by the use of colossal Corinthian pilasters, square and paired at the facades to each street and round and single at the corner.

The exterior is compositionally organized in three levels: the bottom one is a base executed in the pink limestone common to this area; the central and main body is defined by the aforementioned colossal pilasters, which articulate the openings of the two main floors in three-bay modules with additional one-bay modules flanking the longer, Amor Street facade.

The upper body is an elaborate entablature with garlands, dentils, and a projecting, bracketed upper cornice. On top there is a balustered railing filling the space between three broken pediments, the one on the corner curved, with medallions on their centers. The medallions on the facades contain stained glass inserts, and the one on the corner a clock. First-floor openings are arched, those on the second are rectangular. The first-floor windows are covered by bulging cages of fine cast iron bars; those on the second floor are balustered. The entire ensemble is topped by a copper roof in a Mansard configuration.

Officers and historians with the Puerto Rico Historic Preservation Office have stated that "The Banco Crédito building, overall, is a fine example of the early twentieth century Beaux-Arts style which is extensively represented in the Ponce architecture of this period."

== Contemporary use ==
Today, the bank is used as a branch of the Banco de Santander, a Spanish concern that bought the assets of Banco Credito y Ahorro Ponceño during the late 1970s.

== See also ==
- Banco de Ponce (building)
- Banco de Ponce
- Banco Crédito y Ahorro Ponceño
