= Pontifical Catholic University of Puerto Rico School of Architecture =

School of Architecture and Design of the Pontifical Catholic University of Puerto Rico

RHC School of Architecture and Design of the Pontifical Catholic University of Puerto Rico
- Escuela de Arquitectura y Diseño RHC de la Pontificia Universidad Catolica de Puerto Rico
- Type: Private
- Established: 2009; 17 years ago
- Religious affiliation: Roman Catholicism
- Dean: Abel Misla Villalba (2009 - 2011) Javier De Jesús Martínez (2011 - 2014) Dra. Luz M. Rodríguez (2014-2015) Luis Badillo Lozano (2015-2025) Juan Emmanuelli Benvenutti (2025- Presente)
- Academic staff: 35 per semester approximately
- Students: 300
- Location: Ponce, Puerto Rico; 18°00′09.45″N 66°36′57.28″W
- Campus: Urban
- Website: http://ea-pr.com/ https://www.pucpr.edu/arquitectura/ http://ea-pucpr.com/

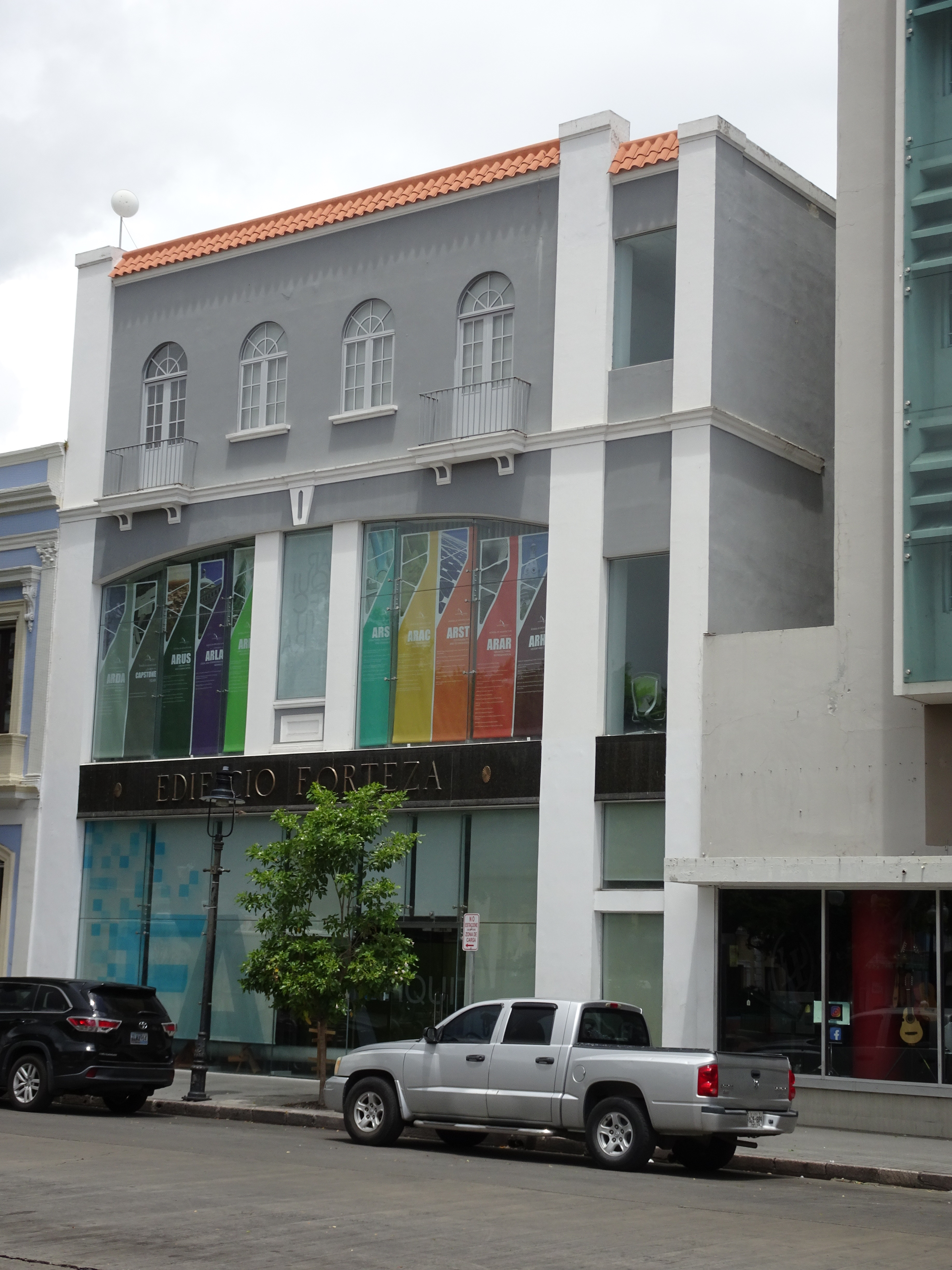
PUCPR School of Architecture and Design in downtown Ponce, at Edificio Forteza

The Pontifical Catholic University of Puerto Rico School of Architecture is an institution of higher learning granting degrees in the field of architecture. It is located in the Ponce Historic Zone, across from Plaza Las Delicias. It was established in 2009. Together with the School of Law, it is one of two semi-autonomous professional colleges of the Pontifical Catholic University of Puerto Rico (PCUPR) in the city of Ponce, Puerto Rico. In 2010, the school won an award from the Southern Puerto Rico Chamber of Commerce for Valor del Año en Educacion (Courage of the Year in Education). The school is accredited by the National Architectural Accrediting Board (NAAB). It has a teaching staff of 40 and a student body of 300. In July 2025, the Director of the academic programs of the School, the Arch. Juan R. Emmanuelli Benvenutti was appointed as the new Dean of the School or Architecture and Design to begin his term in August 1 2025.

== History ==
The history of the school dates back to 2007 when a group of Puerto Rican professionals got together and toyed with the idea of creating a school of architecture to serve southern Puerto Rico. A formal proposal was reviewed by ex-governor Rafael Hernandez Colon, who, at the time, was a member of the Board of Trustees of the PCUPR. Hernandez Colon presented the plan to the Board, and it received unanimous approval. After securing facilities, personnel, and other fundamentals, the school opened its doors in August 2009.

The Pontifical Catholic University of Puerto Rico School of Architecture is the third architecture school established in Puerto Rico. It is located in downtown Ponce, about half a mile from the main campus of the university at Las Americas Avenue. It was founded in August 2009.

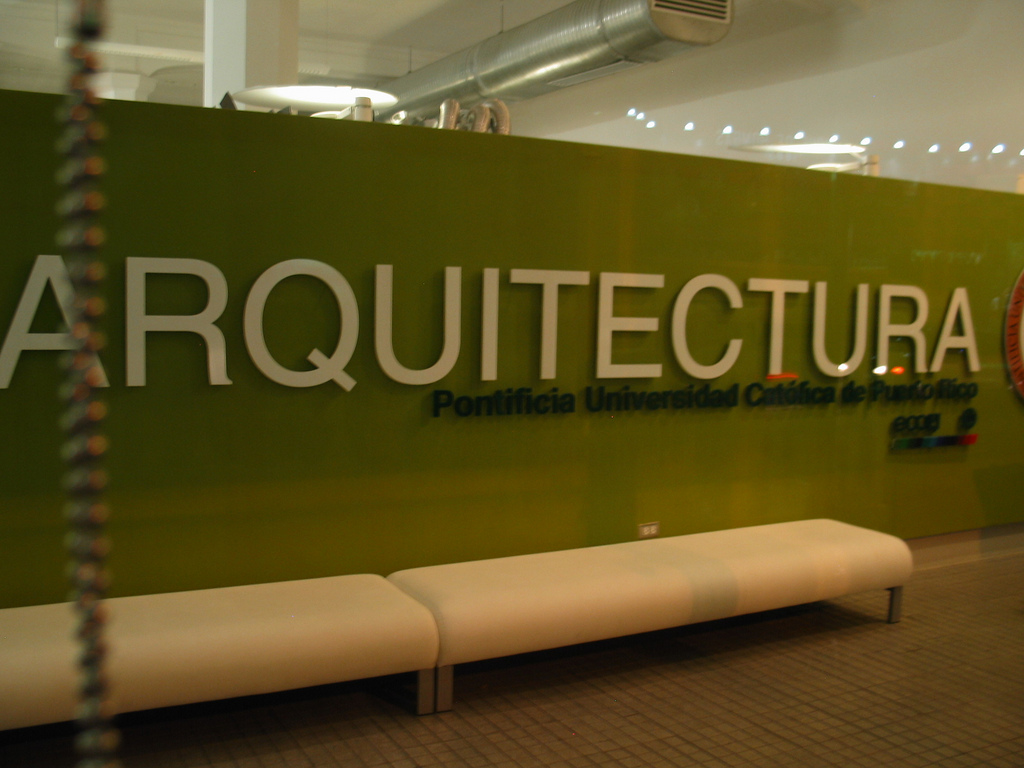
Front entrance to the School of Architecture

== Facilities ==
The school is located at the historic Forteza Building on Atocha street, between Cristina and Isabel streets, in front of Plaza Las Delicias. It was the result of a 14-million-dollar investment. With some $4 million in high-tech equipment "it is one of the most modern [architecture schools] in the Caribbean. The renovation and programmatic adaptation of the historic Forteza building was designed by architect Segundo Cardona FAIA (SCF Architects). The project won the 2010 Honor Mention (Built Project Category) from the American Institute of Architects (AIA), Puerto Rico Chapter.

Students at the School of Architecture enjoy all of the resources of the Pontifical Catholic University of Puerto Rico. The University offers an array of physical activities including fitness classes; weight training; jogging track; basketball and outdoor pool. It also benefits from its location in the city of Ponce, home to various architectural styles dating back several centuries and including the likes of museums, churches, theaters, pompous homes - even a castle.

== Mission ==
The stated mission of the school is "to educate and forge a new architect, planner, thinker and entrepreneur in an interdisciplinary environment; one within which the understanding of the territorial and urban complexity, as well as the regional, and global economic dynamics operate with advanced technologies and knowledge to guide sustainable investments and interventions."

== Programs ==
The 5-year architecture program at the school leads to a Bachelor of Architecture. Is the principal academic program of the school. The school also offers an Associate Degree in Digital Graphic Design established in 2020 and also an Associate Degree in Interior Design launched in 2024. The goal of the school is to have multiple degrees in Design to complement their Bachelor of Architecture in his academic offer <https://arquitectura.pucpr.edu/degrees-programs-2/>

== See also ==
- Pontifical Catholic University of Puerto Rico
- Pontifical Catholic University of Puerto Rico at Mayagüez
- Ponce School of Medicine
- Ponce, Puerto Rico
