= Antiguo Casino de Ponce =

Historic building in Ponce, Puerto Rico

- Casino de Ponce
- U.S. National Register of Historic Places
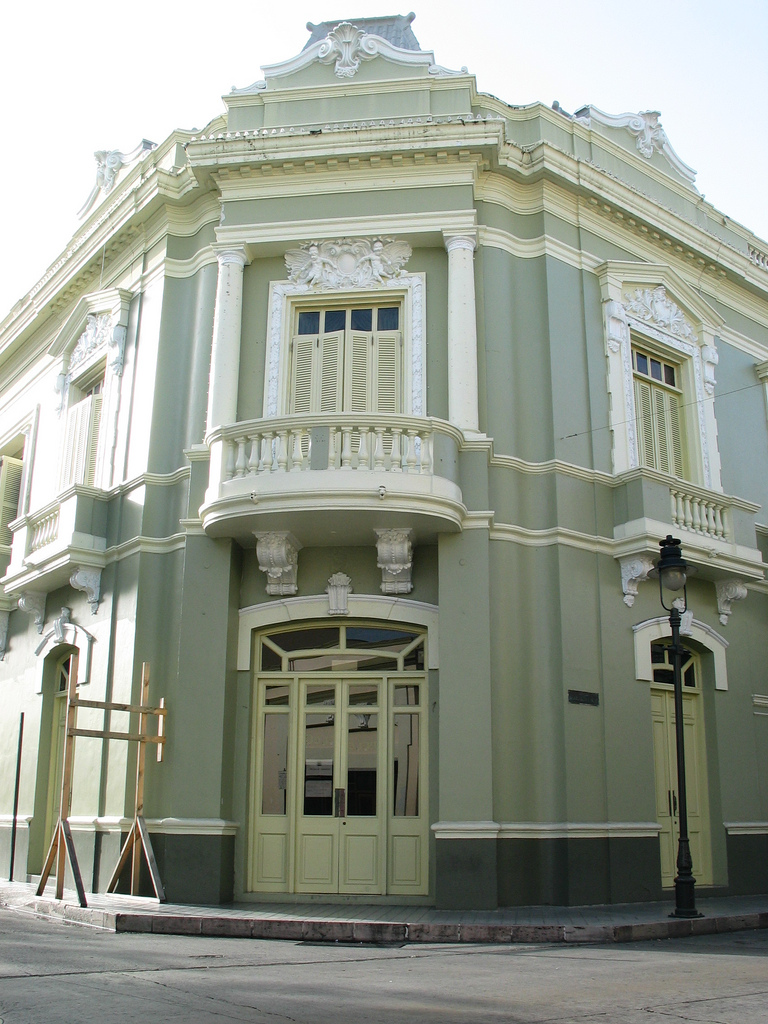
- Casino de Ponce in 2010, looking southeast

- Location within Puerto Rico
- Location: Southeast corner of Calle Marina & Calle Luna, Ponce, Puerto Rico
- Coordinates: 18°00′36″N 66°36′48″W
- Built: 1922
- Architect: Agustin Camilo Gonzalez
- Architectural style: Second Empire, Neo-Rococo
- NRHP reference No.: 87001818
- Added to NRHP: 28 October 1987

The Antiguo Casino de Ponce (English: Old Ponce Casino), or simply the Casino de Ponce, is a historic structure, built in 1922 and located in Barrio Cuarto, Ponce, Puerto Rico. Originally built as a social club for Ponce's elite, it is currently used as the premier reception center of "The Noble City of Puerto Rico". The building, designed by Agustin Camilo Gonzalez in the Second Empire and Neo-Rococo styles, has a French facade and tones. It was listed in the National Register of Historic Places on 28 October 1987. It is located at the corner of Marina and Luna streets. The building has been called "an icon of Ponce's architecture, history, and identity." It is owned and administered by the Ponce Municipal Government. In 1936, during the Great Depression, the Casino declared bankruptcy and shut down. It subsequently had various uses: a postal office, a public health unit, tax collector's office, and even a temporary city hall. In 1990 it was restored by the Ponce Municipal Government, and has since been used for high-ranking official municipal business. For example, it was here where the dinner to honor Prince of Asturias, His Majesty Felipe de Borbon, took place.

== History ==
Ponce had three casinos before this one. The first Casino de Ponce was founded in 1862, on Calle Marina. It met at the location that was later (in 1911) used by Rosendo Matienzo Cintron as his law office. The organization stopped meeting due to political quarrels between the two political factions in its membership representing groups for and against the government of Spanish General Sanz, but it reformed on 19 July 1876. This second Casino de Ponce was located on the second floor of the property owned by Don Carlos Cabrera Martinez, one of the distinguished members of the Ponce high society. Their meeting location was on an elegant structure at the northeast corner of Calle Marina and Calle Cristina, facing Plaza Las Delicias. The third Casino de Ponce reformed on 29 June 1897. It met next to Teatro La Perla, on the east side of Calle Mayor, between Calle Isabel and Calle Cristina, immediately north of the theater. It moved 25 years later, in 1922, to the pompous locale at the southeast corner of Calle Marina and Calle Luna, that is the subject of this article.

When built in 1922, under the sponsorship of Lucas P. Valdivieso, it was actually the replacement quarters for Ponce's exclusive club, the previous one having been destroyed by a hurricane. In addition to its original use, the building has also served as postal office, a public health unit, tax collector's office, and as a temporary city hall. The building was designed by Agustin Camilo Gonzalez, and the artisan works were the product of Jose Cott, Victor Cott, and Camilo Gonzalez, Jr. Local painter Don Miguel Pou was responsible for the painted tapestries. The building was restored in 1990.

== Significance ==
The Old Casino de Ponce stands as a reminder of the wealthy aristocracy of southern Puerto Rico in the late 19th and early 20th century.

From the architectural standpoint, the Old Casino is significant because in its structure the architect managed to incorporate the 19th century Second Empire, neo-Rococo and other architectural styles in concrete construction:"It represents a transitional point from the brick and stucco classical Spanish traditional construction to the modern, reinforced-concrete technology of the United States."

From a social and cultural standpoint, the Old Casino is significant in that it expresses to this day the lifestyle of the area's wealthy families during the early decades of the 20th century. It is a reminder of how they lived and how World War II changed that lifestyle for ever. The lavish second floor ballroom was extensively used prior to WWII as the de facto meeting place for the most wealthy and influential families in Ponce and Puerto Rico. The Casino is associated with the social club that made the structure come to life, a club that has ceased to exist as today's way of life have pushed aside the lifestyle of the aristocracy of yesterday.

== Physical appearance ==
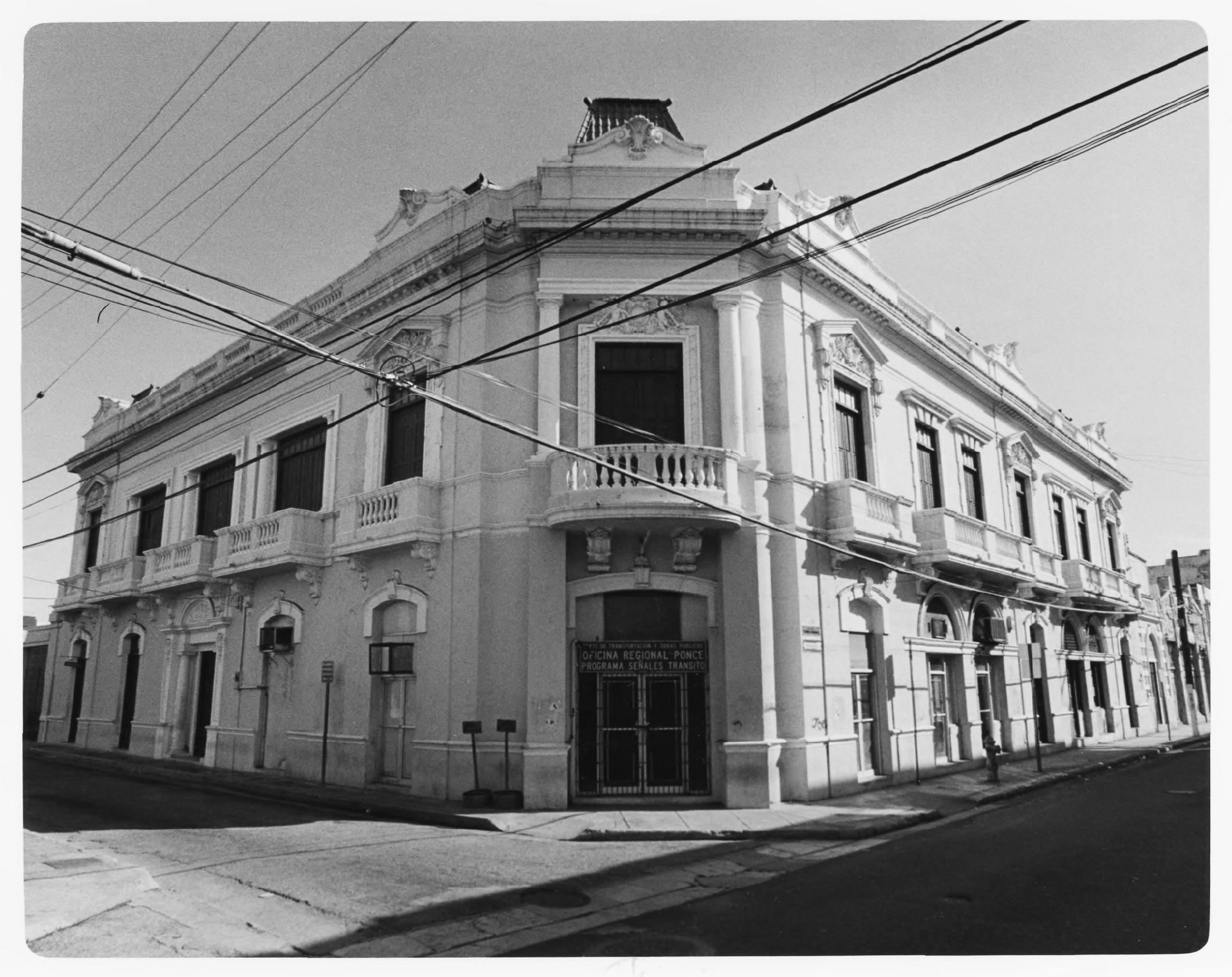
Casino de Ponce in 1984

The Casino de Ponce is a two-story, concrete structure on the southeast corner of Marina and Luna streets in the historic urban center of Ponce. The area of the lot on which it sits measures approximately 38 X 36 meters. It has a chamfered corner at the intersection of the two streets. The architectural style is Rococo-like, including its main relief and mansard roof. Most of the building as it exists today is part of the original structure, the exception being a few of the ground level doors.

=== Facades ===
The building consists of three facades: a northern facade with five bays, a western facade with seven bays, and a single-bay chamfered facade at the intersection of the two other facades.

==== North facade ====
The main entry to the building is via Bay 3 on the north facade at Luna Street. The architectural details on this facade are markedly Spanish-baroque. There is a frontispiece that includes Tuscan columns and pilasters supporting an architrave and blind-arch tympanum above. The spandrel and tympanum areas are terminated in highly detailed plaster reliefs. The other bays (1, 2, 4, and 5) on the northern facade consist of simpler, narrow, arch openings capped by hood-moulds and keystones.

At the upper level of the same facade, the three central bays are articulated as wide, square openings with Tuscan half-columns within, supporting the lintel at either extreme. Bays 1 and 5 are each articulated by a quoined surround and an angular pediment, supported by brackets and decorated with an ornamental relief tympanum.

==== West facade ====
The seven-bay Marina Street facade (the west facade) consists of an ABABA rhythm in which unit A is identical to bays 1 and 5 of the north facade. Unit B consists of ground-storey bays with wider, circular-arch openings and rectangular upper-level openings with quoined surrounds and voussoired lintels.

==== Chamfered facade ====
The single chamfered bay is particularly ornate, as it recesses slightly and then curves outward in a baroque fashion. At the ground floor, a wide, segmental arch opening with a hood-mould accesses secondary office space. At the upper level, a rectangular doorway is crowned by an intricate cameo with angel figures on either side of it. The upper level bay is framed by Tuscan columns which spring from a string-course at the baluster level and support a projection of the building cornice.

=== Embellishments ===
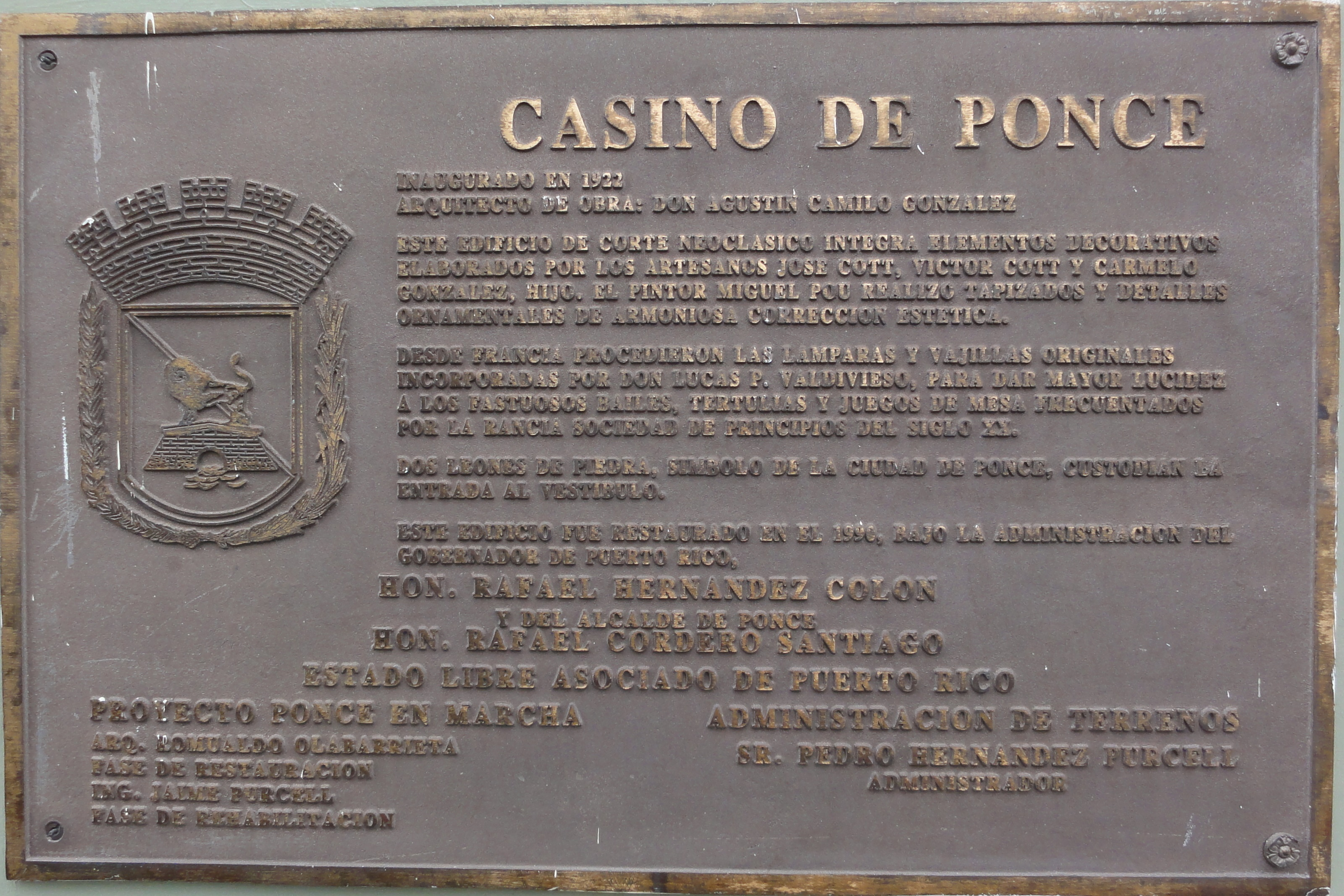
Plaque honoring Mayor Cordero Santiago for the restoration of Casino de Ponce, under the project "Ponce en Marcha".

The entire composition is crowned by a cornice which follows the modulation of the facade. A balustered parapet above the cornice completes the composition. In addition, broken-scroll pediments above the parapet accentuate the composition's rhythm at the central bay of the west facade, the extreme bays of both facades, and the corner chamfer. A "mission-tile" mansard roof completes the composition and accentuates the French influences of the design.

=== Upper level ===
In plan, the main entrance at the north facade accesses directly an ample stairway which leads to the upper level. At this level two large rooms serve as ballrooms: a major open space along the west wall and a smaller reception area on the north. The ground level is currently utilized as office space by a government agency. Access to these areas is through various doorways along the street wall. All upper level bays open out onto individual balustered balconies, except for bays 2 and 3 and bays 5 and 6 of the west facade, which share wider, two-bay balconies. The chamfered bay contains a semi-elliptical balcony which smoothly turns the corner of the two facades.

== Today ==
Today the entire first floor of the building accommodates offices of the Ponce municipal government. The Casino belongs to the people of the municipality of Ponce. The government promotes it as "the ballroom of excellence in the southern region of Puerto Rico," (Spanish: "Salon de Recepcion por Excelencia en el Area Sur") and the government makes it available for social and business events.

=== Facilities ===
Event facilities are all located on the second floor. Access to the second floor facilities is via a wide wooden stairway accessible from the Luna street facade. The second-floor Casino facilities include four main rooms. The Felices Dias ballroom is the largest at 70' x 40.5', and it faces west. It accommodates 300 people. The Impromptu Room faces north and is located next to the bar. It is commonly used as the buffet dinner food area. The third room, Tu y Yo (English: You and I), and informally known as the Blue Room for the color on its walls, faces south and is used only for events consisting of more than 150 guests. The chamfered corner of the building has a smaller, more intimate room than the others, appropriately called The Chamfered Room. It has five doors, including three interior doors plus two exterior doors including the chamfered door.

Other second floor facilities are the kitchen, bar, restrooms, a 16' x 16' balcony and a south-facing terrace. Casino guests also have access to a spacious courtyard on the ground floor featuring a central water fountain. Access to the first floor courtyard is either from a street entrance on Luna street, via an open exterior second-floor stairway that leads directly to the courtyard, or via the elevator, which opens to the exterior, but covered, hallway next to the courtyard.
