= Ponce Health Sciences University =

Private university in Ponce, Puerto Rico

- Type: Private; For-profit
- Established: 1977; 49 years ago
- President: Dr. Kenira J. Thompson García
- CEO: David Lenihan
- Students: Over 1,000 (2019)
- Location: Ponce, Puerto Rico; 17.9939°N 66.6192°W
- Website: www.phsu.edu

The Ponce Health Sciences University (PHSU), formerly Ponce School of Medicine & Health Sciences, is a private, for-profit university with its main campus in Ponce, Puerto Rico. It awards graduate degrees in Medicine (MD), Dentistry (DMD), Clinical Psychology (PsyD and PhD) and School Psychology (MSSP), Biomedical Sciences (PhD), Medical Sciences (MSMS), and Public Health (MPH and DrPH), as well as various undergraduate degrees, including BSN, and professional and postgraduate certifications. In 2019, the university has 360 students in its medical school and, as of 11 February 2019, was authorized to increase the student body at the medical school to 600 which, when fully in place, will make it the largest private medical school in Puerto Rico and one of the largest under the American flag.

The university has a second campus in St. Louis, Missouri, a "University Center" in San Juan, Puerto Rico, and an "International Location" in Tortola, British Virgin Islands. PHSU is owned by Tiber Health Innovation Corporation.

== History ==
What is now Ponce Health Sciences University began in 1976 as the school of medicine of the Pontifical Catholic University of Puerto Rico. Soon after its first medical class in 1977, the university decided to not continue its medical program. In order to save the only medical program in the region, a group of lay and professional leaders in southern Puerto Rico acquired the school of medicine and established the independent Ponce Medical School Foundation, Inc. as a non-profit organization in January 1980. In July 1980, the Council of Higher Education of Puerto Rico (CHE-PR) authorized the Foundation to operate a medical school under the name Ponce School of Medicine. In 1981, the Liaison Committee on Medical Education (LCME) accredited the school to grant the Doctor of Medicine degree.

In 1983, the institution applied for funds under the Minority Biomedical Research Support Program (MBRS) and the Research Center in Minority Institutions (RCMI) Program. A Graduate Program in Biomedical Sciences (PhD) was initiated in 1988, and in 1992 the Council of Higher Education of Puerto Rico (CHE-PR) accredited the PhD Program and authorized PHSU to award a Doctor of Philosophy (PhD) degree in Biomedical Sciences.

In January 1995, the academic institution moved to a new campus with additional facilities. A Clinical Psychology Doctoral Program (PsyD Program) was begun in 1999 which was later expanded to offer a PhD in Psychology, Professional Certificate in Couples and Family Therapy, and Postgraduate Certificate in Neuroscience of Learning.

In August 2002 a Master's of Public Health (MPH) program was started with specialization in Epidemiology, Environmental Health, and General Public Health. A DrPH in Epidemiology is also offered. On 5 September 2014, the Ponce School of Medicine and Health Sciences was acquired by Arist Corporation (since renamed "Tiber Health Innovation Corporation" ), which itself is an investment of global media, services and education company Bertelsmann.

The university has a campus in St. Louis, Missouri. In March 2020 the school "announced an $80 million investment toward creating a new medical school" near their downtown location and on the former Pruitt-Igoe site.

== Organization ==
=== Schools ===
- School of Behavioral & Brain Sciences
- School of Dental Medicine
- School of Medicine
- School of Nursing
- Public Health Program

=== Campuses ===
- Ponce Puerto Rico Campus
- St. Louis Missouri Campus
- San Juan Puerto Rico University Center
- Tortola, British Virgin Islands–International Location

=== Partner Hospitals ===
- Centro Médico Episcopal San Lucas
- Hospital Damas
- Hospital Menonita Ponce
- Hospital Metropolitano Dr. Pila
- Med Centro Healthcare System

== Research ==
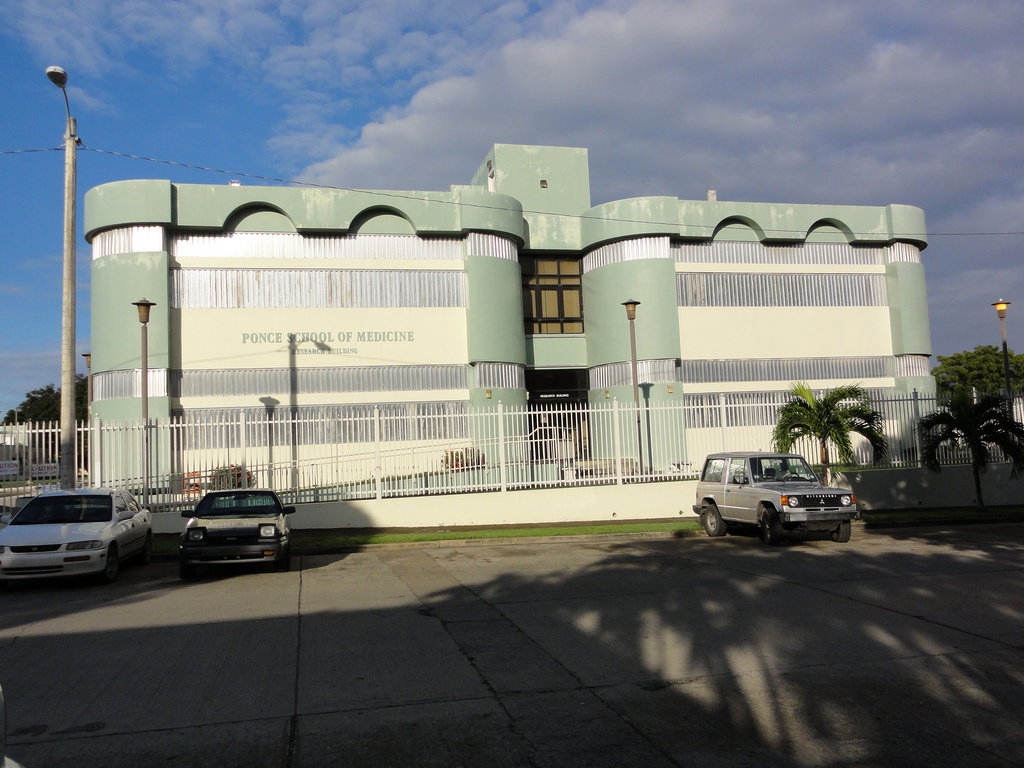
Research Building at Ponce Health Sciences University.

The Ponce Research Institute (PRI) at Ponce Health Sciences University (PHSU) performs research in the basic, behavioral, public health, and clinical sciences. Research areas include non-communicable diseases (cancer, women's health, gastrointestinal disorders), health disparities, infectious diseases (HIV, dengue), neurosciences and behavioral sciences, genetics, and community health outreach (obesity, smoking).

In 2002, an academic partnership was established with the H. Lee Moffitt Cancer Center & Research Institute, with involvement of the National Cancer Institute.

On 4 December 2014, Andreas Charalambous, executive dean of the University of Nicosia Medical School (UNMS), and David Lenihan, president and CEO of PHSU, signed an agreement to promote academic cooperation and collaboration in research.

== Licenses and accreditation ==
The Ponce Health Sciences University is accredited by the following entities:

- Council on Higher Education of Puerto Rico (CHE-PR)
- Middle States Commission on Higher Education
- Liaison Committee on Medical Education (LCME)
- Council on Education for Public Health (CEPH)
- American Psychological Association (APA)
- Accreditation Council for Graduate Medical Education (ACGME)

== Notable alumni ==
- Admiral Joxel García, USPHS, MD, MBA - Medical Director in the Regular Corps of the Public Health Service, former Assistant Secretary of Health and Human Services, and representative of the United States of America on the Executive Board of the World Health Organization.
