= List of hospitals in Ponce, Puerto Rico =

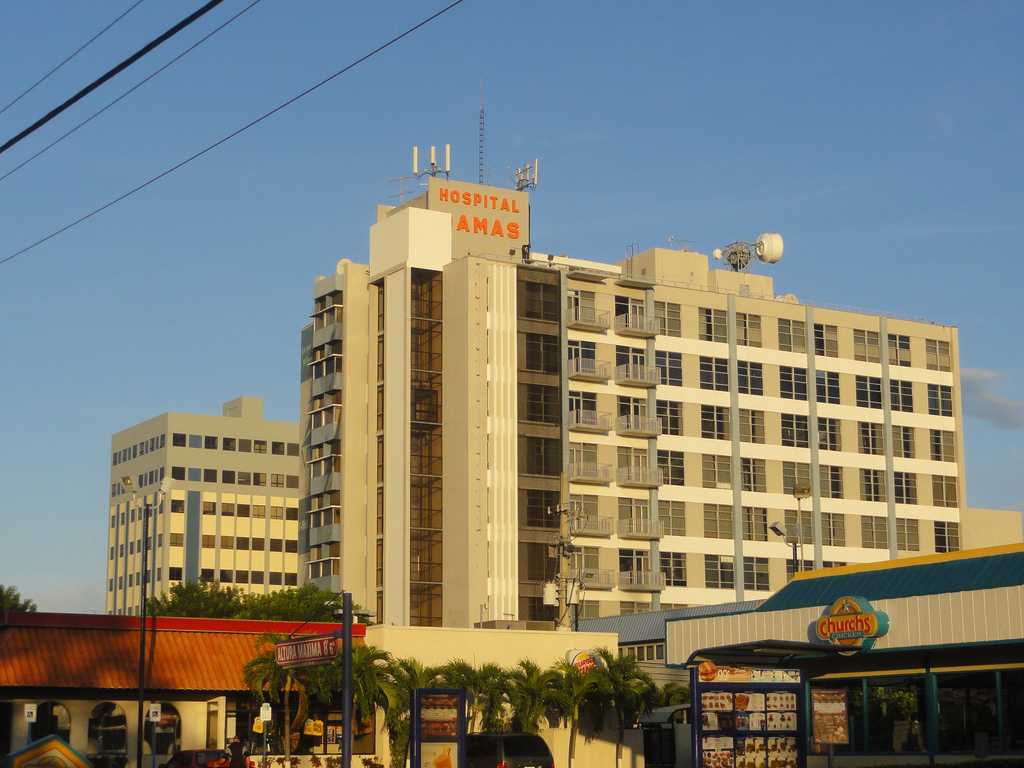
At 331 beds, Hospital Damas is Ponce's largest

This is a list of hospitals in Ponce, Puerto Rico. Both, public and private hospitals are listed. General as well as specialized hospitals are listed.

== Hospital list summary table ==
The following table lists hospitals by their year of founding, that is, their year of opening. A listing sorted by any of the other fields can be obtained by clicking on the header of the field. For example, clicking on "Barrio" will sort hospitals by their barrio location.

No.	Name	Photo	Barrio	Location	Type	Year Opened	Year Current Structure Built	Floors	Beds	Architectural style
1	Hospital Damas		Canas Urbano	PR-2R, Ponce Bypass WB	Teaching Hospital	1863	1973	10	331	Modern
2	Hospital Valentín Tricoche (closed)		Segundo	C. Bertoly & C. Tricoche	General hospital (closed)	1873	1873	3	N/A	Neoclassical
3	Centro Médico Episcopal San Lucas		Machuelo Abajo	PR-14 WB, Av. Tito Castro	General Hospital	1907	2007	7	287	Modern
4	Hospital Metropolitano Dr. Pila		Canas Urbano	Av. Las Américas WB	General hospital	1925	1983	5	210	Modern
5	Hospital Oncológico Andrés Grillasca		Machuelo Abajo	PR-14 WB, Av. Tito Castro	Cancer	1946	1955	2	86	Modern
6	Hospital San Cristóbal (Note: In 29 September 2022, it was acquired by the Sistema de Salud Menonita, ande it is now known as Menonita Ponce. See Concretada la venta a Menonita Ponce. Sandra Caquias Cruz. Periodico EsNoticia. Ponce, Puerto Rico. 2-14 December 2022. Year 7. Issue 184. pp.4-5. Accessed 2 December 2022. Archived.)		Coto Laurel	PR-506 NB and PR-52 WB	General hospital	1983	2006?	UNK	138	Modern

Key:
Av. = Avenida (avenue)
C. = Calle (street)
NB = Northbound
SB = Southbound
WB = Westbound
EB = Eastbound
Unk = Unknown
N/A = Not applicable

== See also ==
- List of hospitals in Puerto Rico
