= Lizzie Graham =

Puerto Rican soprano singer

- Birth name: Sara Isabel Spencer y Vorgt
- Born: c. 1844; Ponce, Puerto Rico
- Died: 1927; Ponce, Puerto Rico
- Genres: Danza
- Occupations: Soprano singer
- Instruments: Voice

Lizzie Graham (c. 1844–1927) was a late 19th-century Puerto Rican soprano singer from Ponce, Puerto Rico.

== Early years ==
Lizzie Graham (born Sara Isabel Spencer y Vorgt) was born in Ponce, Puerto Rico in about 1844. Her parents were Mr. Spencer, an Englishman, and Mrs. Guell (born ca. 1810) from the French Antilles. Graham trained in the arts in England, France, Germany, and Italy, specializing in singing at the Milan Conservatory. In Florence, Italy, she studied singing and voice under professor Adolfo Bach of the Lamperti school, "the most famed school of the time".

== Career ==
Graham was a frequent singer at temples and social centers with no other purpose that to accentuate festivities and to participate in charity works. She took part in the 1882 Ponce Fair and was a regular participant at the Ponce Cathedral in its singing activities. Most prayer compositions by Juan Morel Campos (1857–1896) were written specifically for Graham. Graham, who profoundly influenced opera music in Puerto Rico, choose not to travel abroad on a professional character, choosing instead to stay in Puerto Rico where she was also involved in charity work. "In her home there was always food and shelter for the less fortunate." In Ponce she founded the Ponce Benevolent Society and was the president of the Club de Señoras (Ponce Ladies Club). On 5 August 1992, the Puerto Rico Chapter of the Union de Mujeres Americanas erected a "Monumento a la Mujer" monument at the fork intersection of Calle Marina and Calle Mayor streets, half a block north of Lizzie Graham's home.

Graham distinguished herself as a great singer. Upon Graham's return to Puerto Rico from Europe, she trained others in singing. Among her students was noted international soprano singer Amalia Paoli, Tomasita Otero, and Anatilde Candamo.

== Family life ==
Sara Isabel Spencer, who was called "Lizzie" as a little girl, married Roberto Graham Fraser from whence she came to be known as Lizzie Graham. They had a son whom they named Roberto. Roberto Graham went on to marry a woman named Palmira Perez and had three daughters (Lizzie Graham's granddaughters) named Luz Isabel, Nilde, and Delma. They lived in the same house as Lizzie Graham had lived decades before, the same house where Lizzie Graham had entertained over many years dozens of musicians from musical companies arriving to Puerto Rico from various overseas countries. The house, which no longer exists, was for over 150 years the oldest fully standing residence in the city of Ponce. It was located on calle Marina across from the historic Iglesia de la Santísima Trinidad. The ultra-colonial nature of its furnishings was admired on various occasions by Puerto Rican archaeologist Ricardo Alegria.

Lizzie Graham's husband, Roberto S. Graham, was born in Scotland and was educated as an engineer. He brought the first automobile to Ponce. In the late nineteenth century Roberto Graham had a foundry at the intersection of Calle Jobo and Calle Marina in Ponce. Years later (1925), the location of Graham's foundry would come to be used by Dr. Pila to build the Clínica Quirúrgica Dr. Pila which today (2019) is Hospital Metropolitano Dr. Pila (it has since moved to more spacious quarters at Avenida Las Américas).

== Honors ==
- For her dedication and talent, a school in Ponce bears her name. (On 9 August 2017, the school was turned into a center for survivors of sexual violence.)
- The city of Toa Baja named an important thoroughfare in her honor in the Seventh Section of Levittown, a Barrio of that city.

== Death ==
Lizzie Graham died in 1927.

== See also ==
- List of Puerto Ricans
