= Manuel de la Pila Iglesias =

Puerto Rican physician

Dr. Manuel de la Pila Iglesias
- "One of the giants of Puerto Rican medicine"
- Born: 16 November 1884; Cádiz, Spain
- Died: 7 October 1950 (aged 65); Cayey, Puerto Rico
- Education: University of Barcelona (M.D.); Mayo Clinic
- Years active: 1917 - 1950
- Known for: Co-founderd the University of Puerto Rico School of Medicine; Founded Hospital Dr. Pila; Brought the first X-ray and EKG machines to Puerto Rico
- Relatives: Marina Valdecilla (wife)
- Medical career
- Profession: Physician
- Institutions: Hospital Tricoche; Hospital Damas; Hospital San Lucas
- Sub-specialties: Surgery, electrocardiography, otorhinolaryngology, allergy, others
- Awards: "Physician of physicians" Order of the Knights of Saint Gregory; Order of Saint Gregory

Manuel de la Pila Iglesias (November 16, 1884 – October 7, 1950) was a Puerto Rican physician practicing in Ponce, Puerto Rico, who specialized in a half-dozen medical specialities. He founded a medical clinic in Ponce that grew into a large medical center. Pila Iglesias is considered "one of the giants of Puerto Rican medicine". He was also one of the leaders behind the development of the School of Medicine of the University of Puerto Rico.

== Early years ==
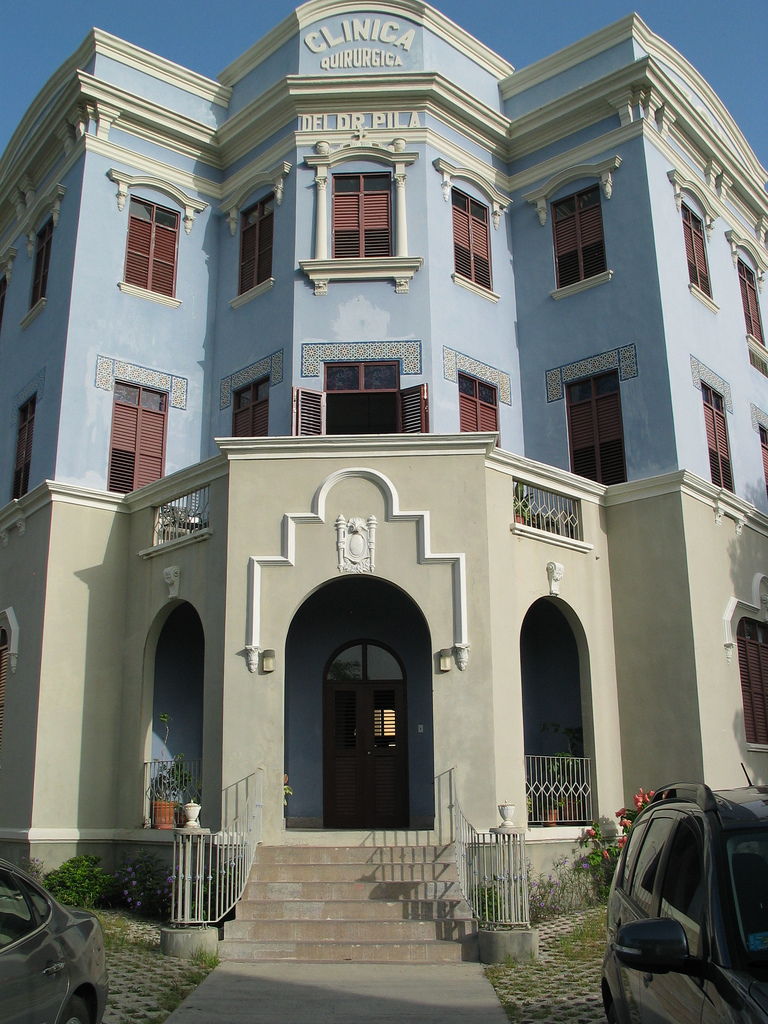
Main entrance to the old Dr. Pila Clinic/Hospital (now an apartment building) looking Northwest in Barrio Primero, Ponce, Puerto Rico. Founded in 1925.

Manuel de la Pila Iglesias was born in Cádiz, Spain, on 16 November 1884. His parents were Manuel de la Pila Mantes, a Spaniard, and Asuncion Iglesias Geneviera, a Puerto Rican woman. After the death of his father and brother, he moved to Ponce with his mother. He was brought up in the home of his uncle on his mother's side, Dr. Iglesias, whom he came to admire and on whose footsteps he later follow. He studied at the Colegio Central Ponceño (Ponce Central High School) and upon graduation traveled to Spain to study medicine at the University of Barcelona.

== Medical studies ==
After receiving his medical degree, de la Pila Iglesias (or Pila Iglesias, as he is more commonly known) started his journey through specialization into many areas of medicine. He went to the San Antoine Hospital in Paris, the Mayo Clinic in Minnesota, the Laboratory for Technical Surgery in Chicago, the Philadelphia Hospital in Pennsylvania, and the Hamburg Hospital in Germany. Afterwards, he studied electrocardiography in Berlin, otorhinolaryngology in Vienna, and allergy in Venezuela and Cuba.

== Medical practice ==
In 1917, Pila Iglesias returned to Ponce to start his prolific professional career. He first worked as a municipal government physician at Ponce's Tricoche Municipal Hospital, which had been built in 1875. He also practiced at the San Lucas Hospital and the Ponce Santo Asilo de Damas Hospital, where he became medical director. An X-ray machine Pila Iglesias purchased in the United States in 1913 was the first such machine in Ponce. He also later acquired an EKG machine in Germany. It is believed this was the first EKG in Puerto Rico.

== Foundations ==
In 1925, Pila Iglesias founded the Dr. Pila Surgical Clinic in Ponce. A few years later he founded the Mercedes Hospital and the Central Clinic to provide medical care to low income families. In 1929 he founded the Children's Catholic Dispensatory. He also worked for the Federal Public Health at the barrio Playa de Ponce. Pila Iglesias implemented various novel and experimental treatments in Puerto Rico earning him a reputation as the physician of physicians.

== Medical insurance legislation ==
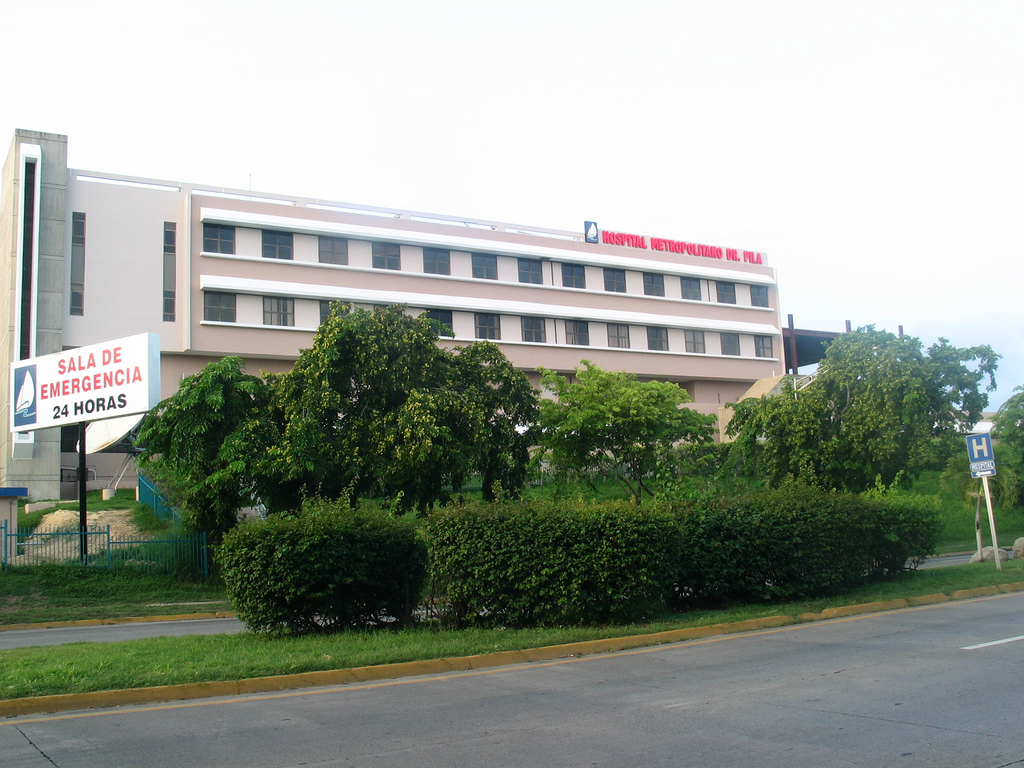
The new Hospital Dr. Pila (now, Hospital Metropolitano Dr. Pila) on Avenida Las Americas (PR-163) looking NE in Barrio Canas Urbano, Ponce

Pila Iglesias' efforts at the Puerto Rico Legislature resulted in the first medical insurance plan in the island: Cruz Azul de Puerto Rico. The plan provided help to working people and middle class individuals in the payment of medical expenses.

== Civic and social activities ==
He was also involved in the civic and social environment in Ponce. In 1919 he was amongst the founders of the Ponce Rotary Club, the second such club on the Island. He also founded the Club Deportivo de Ponce.

== Representative in the medical community ==
Pila Iglesias was involved in the Puerto Rico Medical Association, becoming its president during a two-year term. He was also a delegate from Puerto Rico in the American Medical Association. Pila Iglesias was chosen several times to attend national and international medical congresses as a delegate from Puerto Rico.

== University of Puerto Rico Medical School ==
Among the many contributions of Pila Iglesias was his involvement on the establishment and development of the medical school at the University of Puerto Rico. Appointed by UPR Rector Jaime Benitez, Pila Iglesias was one of the major leaders in the study that later made possible the creation of the medical school that for many decades was the only school graduating physicians in Puerto Rico. The magnitude of his work was felt for many years after his death.

== Accolades ==
He awarded the Order of the Knights of Saint Gregory by Pope Pius XI. On 15 November 1930, Pope Pius XI knighted Pila into the Order of Saint Gregory for his excellence in science, medicine, and religious matters.

== Death ==
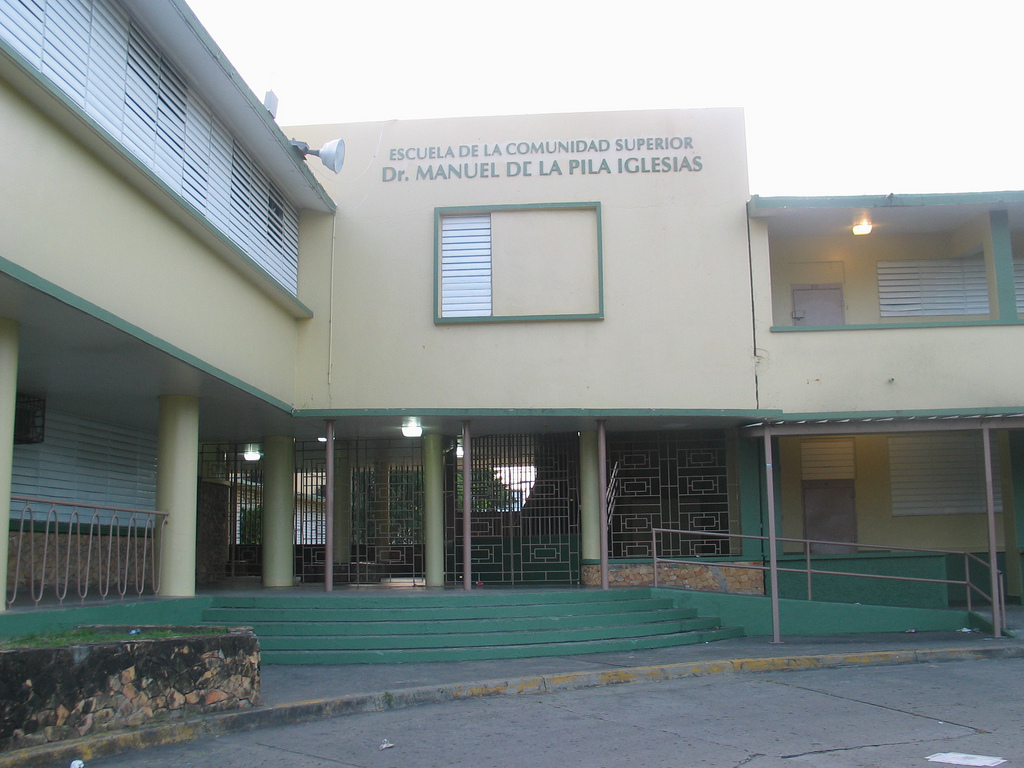
Main entrance to the Dr. Pila High School in Barrio Canas Urbano, Ponce, Puerto Rico

Pila Iglesis died on October 7, 1950, in an automobile accident in Cayey, Puerto Rico, as he returned from a meeting of the Puerto Rico Medical Association. His was buried at Cementerio Catolico San Vicente de Paul in Ponce.

== Legacy ==
The clinic he founded in Ponce, now a major medical center in that city, still carries his name, Hospital Metropolitano Dr. Pila. There is also a high school in Ponce named after Pila. Escuela Superior Dr. Pila opened on 17 September 1954. (Note: In 2020, after the effects of the 2020 Puerto Rico earthquakes, Escuela Superior Dr. Pila --together with four other Ponce public schools (Escuela Elemental Julio Collazo Silva (Bo. Tibes), Escuela Intermedia Antonio E. Paoli (C. Reina Final), Escuela Elemental Carmen Sola de Pereira (Urb. Jardines del Caribe), and Escuela (de niveles multiples) de Bellas Artes (C. Lolita Tizol))-- was declared unfit for use, and is currently (July 2020) closed. (See Miguel Diaz Roman. "Los temblores, el coronavirus y la falta de refugios complica temporada de huracanes a los sureños." Es Noticia. 10 July 2020 to 23 July 2020. Year 5. Issue 122. Page 4. Accessed 10 July 2020.)) Also in Ponce, there is a public housing development named to his memory, Residencial Dr. Pila. He is also recognized for his contributions to medicine at the Ponce Park for the Illustrious Ponce Citizens.

== See also ==
- Ponce, Puerto Rico
- List of Puerto Ricans
