= Timoteo Luberza =

Puerto Rican engineer

Timoteo Luberza de San Martín
- Born: c. 1820; Ponce, Puerto Rico
- Died: c. 1895; Ponce, Puerto Rico
- Known for: Civil Engineering, Architecture
- Notable work: Plaza del Mercado de Ponce, Aqueducts, Bridges, Roads, various other buildings.

Timoteo Luberza de San Martín (ca. 1820 - ca. 1895) was a nineteenth-century Puerto Rican engineer from Ponce, Puerto Rico. He was responsible for the 1875 Ponce water supply system, including the dam in Rio Portugues, and the Calle del Agua masonry arch aqueduct in barrio Portugues Urbano in Ponce. In 1864, he served briefly as mayor of the nearby town of Yauco. He is best remembered for designing Plaza del Mercado de Ponce.

== Works ==
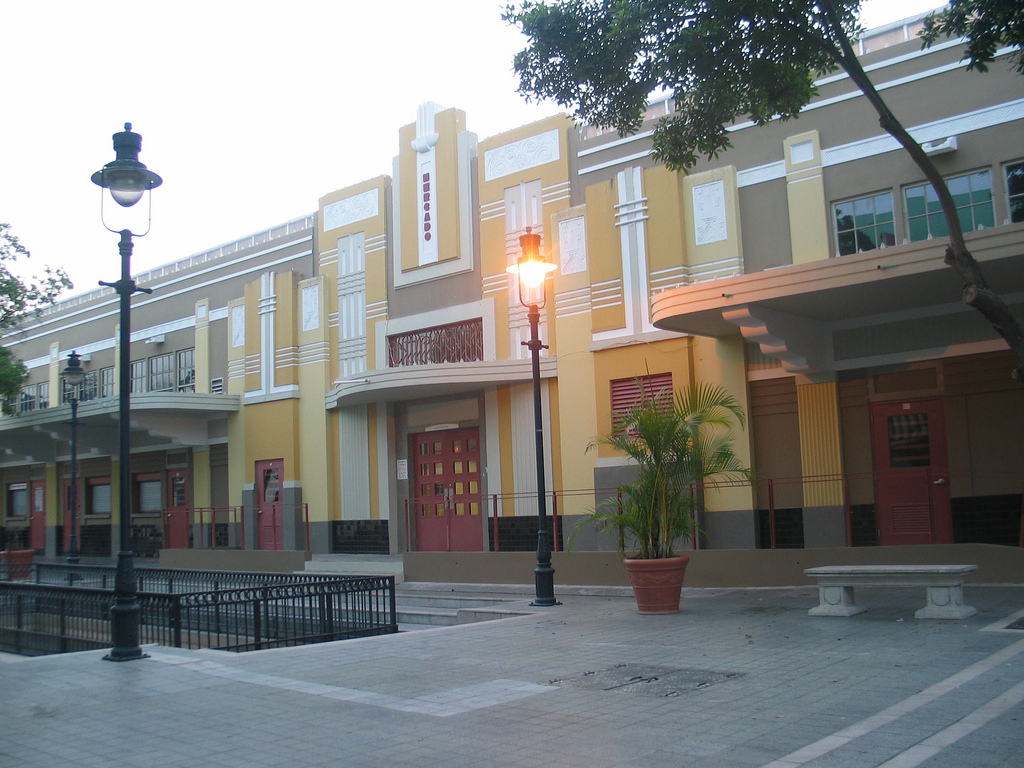
One of the designs of Luberza was Plaza de Mercado in Ponce

Luberza was Public Works Inspecting Engineer for Puerto Rico's Western District. Luberza also designed aqueducts, bridges, roads, and various buildings. In 1878, he owned hacienda Retiro in Barrio Vayas.

=== Ponce-Juana Diaz and Coamo-Aibonito roads ===
In 1858, he designed the road from Ponce to Juana Diaz and, in 1861, the road from Coamo to Aibonito, parts of the Carretera Central.

=== Plaza del Mercado de Ponce ===
In the early 1860s, Luberza designed Ponce's Plaza del Mercado Isabel II (Market place). The marketplace opened in 1863 under the mayoral administration of Luis de Quixano. Its design was a reduced model of the Paris Marketplace.

=== Bridge Number 173 ===
With a budget of 15,405 Spanish pesos, he also designed Bridge Number 173 over Río Las Minas in barrio San Idelfonso, Coamo, Puerto Rico. It was completed in 1862, and rebuilt in 1898 by the US Army Corps of Engineers, after being partly destroyed by the Spanish to keep the American invaders from advancing north towards San Juan at the Battle of Asomante. Bridge 173 is 6.7 meters long. It is on the road between Coamo and Juana Díaz, at kilometer 30.4 of PR-14, and it is the only original and still standing bridge on the southern section of the Carretera Central.

=== Ponce aqueduct ===
Luberza designed the Ponce aqueduct system, called "Acueducto Alfonso XII". It was 4,100 meters (2.5 mi) long. Construction of the aqueduct started on 21 August 1876. The 1876 cost was $220,000 U.S. dollars. It became operational in that year. It was completed in 1880 and it operated for 48 years—until 1928. At its highest point the aqueduct rose 50 feet high. It was made possible by a generous 54,000 Spanish pesos donation from Valentin Tricoche, who also left in his will moneys for the construction of a hospital, Hospital Tricoche.

== See also ==
- Blas Silva
- Francisco Porrata Doria
- List of Puerto Ricans
