= Luberza =

Luberza is a given name and surname. Notable people with the name include:

- Isabel Luberza Oppenheimer, Puerto Rican brothel owner
- Timoteo Luberza, Puerto Rican engineer
