= San Juan Bautista School of Medicine =

Private medical school in Caguas, Puerto Rico

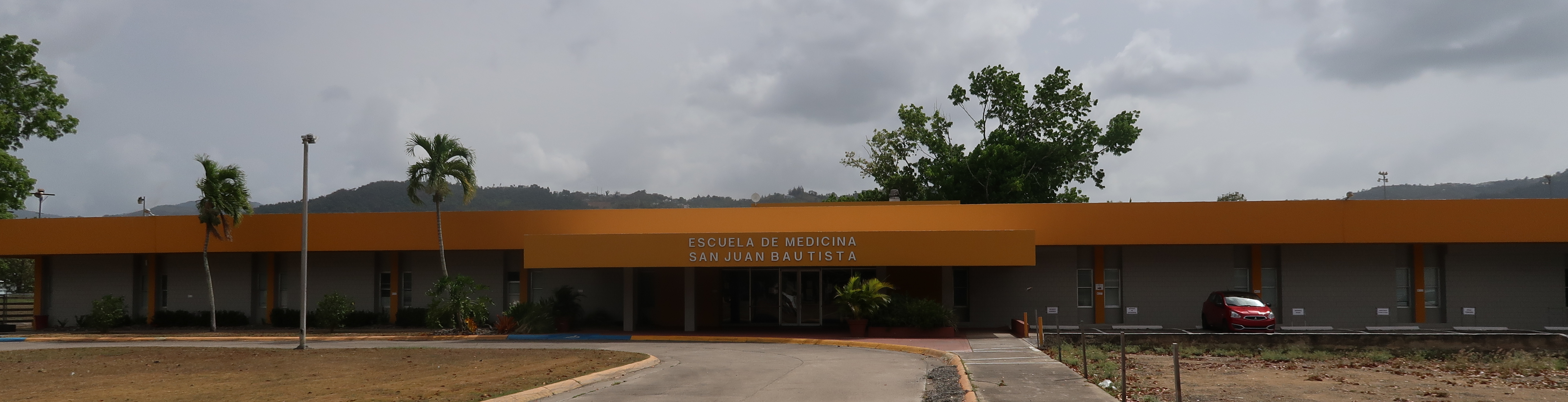
- San Juan Bautista School of Medicine
- Motto: Community-Based School of Medicine
- Type: Private medical school
- Established: 1978; 48 years ago
- President: Yocasta Brugal
- Location: Caguas, Puerto Rico; 18°13′05″N 66°01′47″W
- Website: www.sanjuanbautista.edu

The San Juan Bautista School of Medicine (SJBSM) is a private medical school in Caguas, Puerto Rico. It formally opened its doors in 1978. The school grants the Doctor of Medicine (M.D.), Master in Public Health (M.P.H.), Master of Science in Physician Assistant Studies (MPAS), and Bachelor of Science in Nursing degrees. The institution also has a local Transitional Year program. The school is institutionally accredited by the Middle States Commission on Higher Education with several of its programs holding programmatic accreditation from relevant accreditors; its Liaison Committee on Medical Education (LCME) accreditation is currently on probation.

== History ==
SJBSM was founded in 1978 in San Juan, Puerto Rico as a non profit corporation, incorporated under the laws of Puerto Rico. In 1979, it was authorized by the Council of Higher Education of Puerto Rico to offer studies pertinent to the M.D. degree. The institution continued to develop through the years, and it moved its facilities to the city of Caguas in 1988, an important urban center in Puerto Rico with nearly 150,000 inhabitants.

In February 1998, the Middle States Association, granted Candidacy for Accreditation Status to the School. It was in November 1998 that was certified to participate in the Title IV Program of the Department of Federal Education, specifically in the Federal Family Education Loan Program. In 1999, the school bought Caguas' Regional Hospital, Dr. Eduardo Garrido Morales, and took control over its operations under the name of San Juan Bautista Hospital. In 2004, SJBSM was accredited by the Commission on Higher Education of the Middle States Association of Colleges and Schools. SJBSM has been accredited by the Liaison Committee on Medical Education since 2007. It also became a member of the Board of Medical Examiners of Puerto Rico.

In late 2011, the assets of the San Juan Bautista Hospital were acquired by the Mennonite Health System (Sistema de Salud Menonita), changing its name to Hospital Menonita de Caguas. As part of a thirty-year rental agreement, the Department of Health of Puerto Rico conditioned the acquisition on retaining the school of medicine and its residencies.

== Licenses and accreditations ==
- Liaison Committee on Medical Education (LCME) (on probation)
- Middle States Commission on Higher Education
- Council on Higher Education of Puerto Rico (CHE-PR)
- Joint Commission on Accreditation of Health Care Organizations (JCAHO)
- Board of Medical Examiners of Puerto Rico
- Accreditation Review Commission on Education for the Physician Assistant (ARC-PA)
