= Rafael López Nussa =

Puerto Rican physician

Dr. Rafael López Nussa
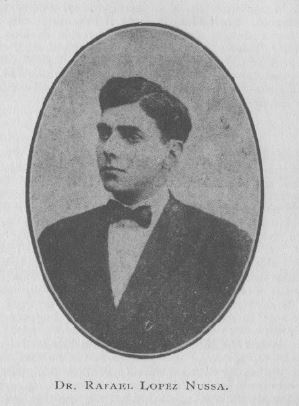
- Rafael López Nussa
- Born: 22 February 1885; Mayagüez, Puerto Rico
- Died: 3 March 1943; San Juan, Puerto Rico
- Education: Georgetown University School of Medicine (MD); New York Post Graduate Medical School; Chicago Laboratory of Surgical Technique
- Years active: ca. 1915 (?) - 1943
- Known for: First heart surgery operation in Puerto Rico; Co-founder of the Puerto Rico National Guard
- Medical career
- Profession: Physician, Public servant
- Institutions: Hospital Tricoche; Hospital San Lucas; Hospital de Distrito de Ponce; Escuela de Medicina Tropical

Rafael López Nussa (22 February 1885 – 3 March 1943) was a Puerto Rican physician and public servant. In 1916 López Nussa performed the first heart surgery operation in Puerto Rico.

== Early years ==
López Nussa was born in Mayaguez, Puerto Rico, on 22 February 1885. He was the son of Ramon B. López, an Austrian, and Micaela Nussa, a Spaniard from Barcelona. Rafael López Nussa was the brother of María Asunción, who married Bailey K. Ashford.

== Education ==
After completing his schooling years and graduating from high school in Puerto Rico, López Nussa entered college and graduated with a degree in medicine from Georgetown University School of Medicine in 1906. He graduated with specialization from the New York Post Graduate Medical School in 1913, and from the Chicago Laboratory of Surgical Technique in 1916.

== Career ==
He returned to Puerto Rico and performed as medical director at the Hospital Tricoche in Ponce from 1907 to 1920. He represented Puerto Rico at the International Congress for Medicine in London in 1913. In 1916 he performed a delicate cardiac surgical procedure at Hospital Tricoche in Ponce; it is so registered in the records of the Puerto Rico Medical Association as the first such procedure performed in Puerto Rico.

In 1918 he took a position at the Hospital San Lucas as surgeon and medical director. He was also a surgeon at Ponce's Hospital de Distrito, a public government institution serving south-central Puerto Rico, and was also a medical consultant for the new Escuela de Medicina Tropical in San Juan, Puerto Rico.

== Political and other activities ==
In 1915, Lopez Nussa was one of the co-founders of the Puerto Rico National Guard. In 1928, he was president of Ponce School Board. He was also president of the Ponce Rotary Club, vice-president of the Puerto Rico Medical Association, member of the American Board of Surgeons, and the physician for the Ponce Firefighters Corps. In 1930, he presided over the medical group that traveled to the Dominican Republic to care for victims of San Zenon tropical storm. In 1934, Lopez Nussa formed part of the welcoming committee for the arrival of U.S. President Franklin Delano Roosevelt and his wife to Ponce.

== Death ==
López Nussa died in San Juan on 3 March 1943.

== Legacy ==
- There is a public housing developments in Ponce named after Lopez Nussa.
- He is also recognized as one of Ponce's notable physicians at the Park of the Illustrious Ponce Citizens.
- In San Juan, the municipal hospital is named in his honor.
- In Ponce, there is also a school named in his memory.

== See also ==
- List of Puerto Ricans
