= José N. Gándara =

Puerto Rican physician and public servant (1907–1954)

Dr. José Nicolás Gándara Cartagena
- Born: 26 August 1907; Ponce, Puerto Rico
- Died: 12 October 1954; Philadelphia, Pennsylvania
- Education: Long Island College of Medicine (MD)
- Occupations: Physician, public servant

Dr. José Nicolás Gándara Cartagena (August 26, 1907 – October 12, 1954) was a Puerto Rican physician and public servant. He led medical personnel in the treatment of the hundreds of wounded of the Ponce massacre that occurred on Palm Sunday, 1937, in Ponce, Puerto Rico, at the hands of the Insular Police, under orders of the American colonial governor Blanton Winship. He also provided expert witness testimony regarding the Puerto Rican Nationalists victims being shot on their backs while they ran away from the police, and that many were wounded by the police using their clubs and bare fists.

== Early years ==
José N. Gándara Cartagena was born in Ponce, Puerto Rico, on 26 August 1907. He was the son of Manuel Gándara and Mercedes Cartagena Gandara graduated from Ponce High School in 1925. After this, he went to college graduating from the Long Island College of Medicine in 1933 and did his internship in the Ponce Presbyterian Hospital the next year. In 1934-1936 he worked as a resident physician at the Clinica Quirurgica del Dr. Pila. He continued his medical lifelong training at the New York Polyclinic Medical Hospital. In 1949, he also studied at the Instituto de Cardiología de México.

== Career ==
=== Medical ===
As a physician, Gándara specialized in internal medicine, radiology and cardiology. He practiced in Ponce from 1933 to 1942. Gándara was a member of the Puerto Rico Medical Association, the American Medical Association and the American Society Against Diabetes, in addition to holding membership in other numerous civic and professional organizations in Puerto Rico.

=== Public service ===
Dr. Gandara held over a dozen different public servant positions in Puerto Rico, not only in health field but also in public housing and other areas. He was also Deputy Commissioner of Health of the Commonwealth from 1943 to 1945. He was also one of the founders of the Popular Democratic Party of Puerto Rico.

He was a radiologist for the Puerto Rico Department of Health (1946–1952); consulting physician for Puerto Rico's Fondo del Seguro del Estado (1950–1952); physician for the Puerto Rico Teachers Association (1945–1952); member of the Board of Regents of the University of Puerto Rico School of Medicine (1942–1950); president of the Board of Commissioners of the Puerto Rico Housing Authority 1946.

=== Political ===
In 1942, he was appointed by governor Luis Muñoz Marín as a member of Puerto Rico's Consejo Superior de Enseñanza (later, Consejo de Educación Superior) at a time when he was public welfare director in the municipality of Ponce (1941–1943). He was one of the founders of the Popular Democratic Party of Puerto Rico, but declined various other political positions due to his various other responsibilities in his gubernamental positions.

== Death ==
In 1954, Dr. Gándara was in the midst of a major government initiative for the creation of public housing in Puerto Rico in order to eliminate ghettos in the Island. At that time, while in Philadelphia, Pennsylvania, he suffered a coronary thrombosis that killed him. He died on 12 October 1954; he was 47 years old. Jaime Benítez, said this about Dr. Gándara: "The death of José Gándara leaves a void in the first row of the people of our generation dedicated to public service and particularly dedicated to harnessing science for the service of those who cannot afford medical care. He consecrated with integrity the resources of his intelligence, his education and his care in order to provide service far beyond the call of duty. He leaves us an enduring memory and example of dedication and love for his fellow men."

== Legacy ==
On 2 November 1954, the then Secretary of Education, Mariano Villaronga, stated that a middle school would be built in Río Piedras to honor his memory. He used these words: "Doctor Gándara dedicated his time and effort to urban renewal, to the elimination of poor housing and to the construction of public housing. In his private life he raised an exemplary home. He was a man like God wants men to be: with human warmth, generous in his service to others, fully given to those things of a valuable character. He was thoroughly dedicated to those things he believed in. No one knew the existence in him of rancor, hate, or resentment. Whenever he had prejudice it was invariably in favor of something or someone that deserved it."

In addition, there are public housing developments in Ponce and Moca named after Dr. Gandara. There is a high school in Aibonito, Puerto Rico named in his memory. He is recognized as a distinguished illustrious citizens in the field of Medicine at the Park of the Illustrious Ponce Citizens.

Also, the once Hospital de Distrito de Ponce, since privatized and renamed Hospital Episcopal San Lucas, was named Hospital de Distrito Jose N. Gándara was it first opened in May 1955. The then-ultramodern 4-story facility was built to replace the 2-story Hospital de Distrito de Ponce on Victoria and Distrito streets built in 1929.

In Massachusetts, there is a community support agency named after Dr. Gándara, the Gándara Center, which offers a range of services in the cities of Springfield and Holyoke. The services offered include education and support to youths, mental health counseling, respite, adult foster care, substance abuse rehabilitation, STARR program, in-home therapy, care coordination (for children and adults), and other medical services.

== See also ==
- List of Puerto Ricans
