= Acueducto de Ponce =

Historic gravity-based water supply system in Ponce, Puerto Rico

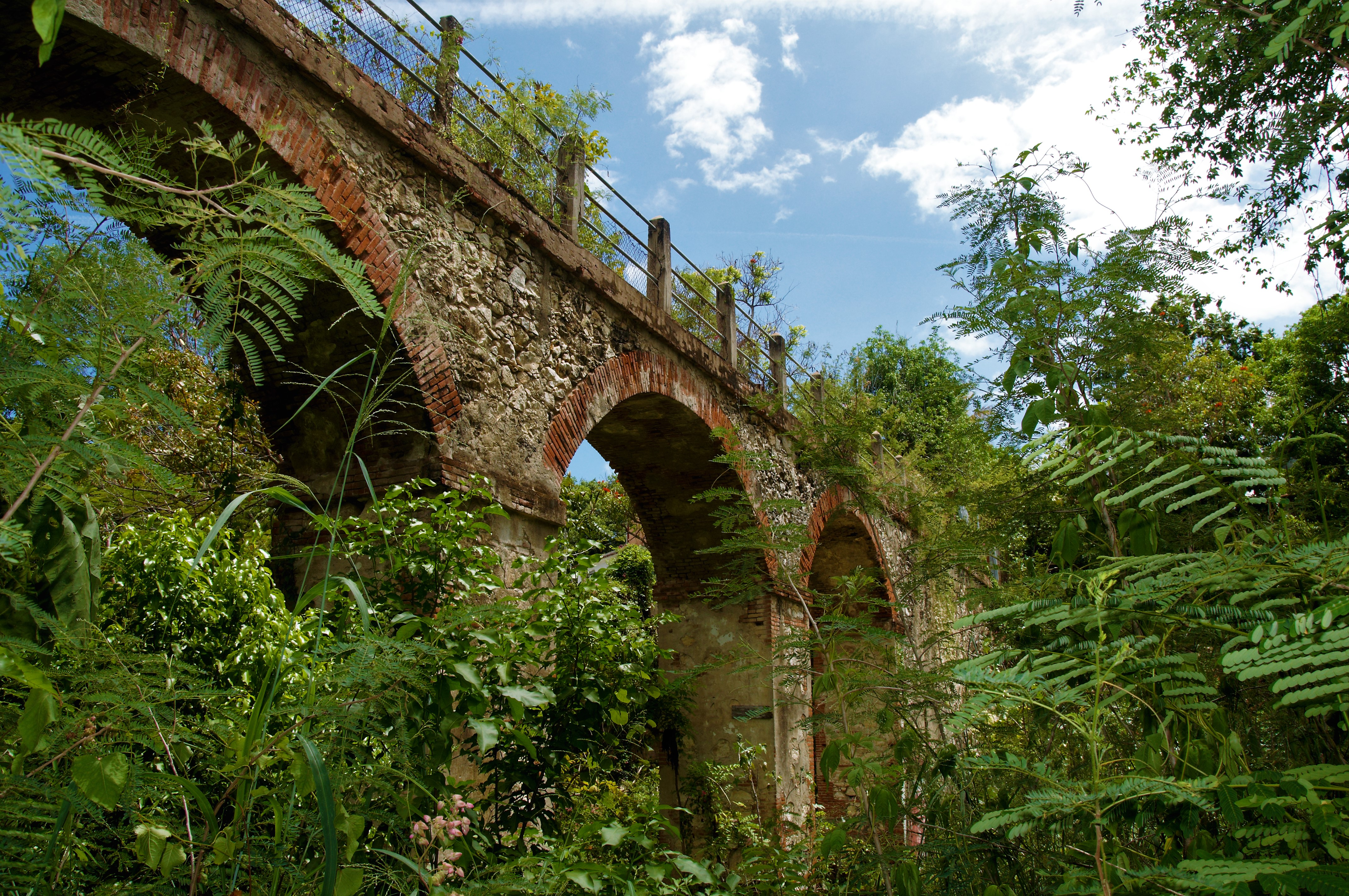
- El Murallón de La Cantera portion of the Acueducto Alfonso XII
- Coordinates: 18°01′17″N 66°36′51″W
- Begins: Río Portugués, San Patricio, Ponce, Puerto Rico; 18.02085°N 66.61380°W
- Ends: Cerro San Tomás; Barrio Sexto, Ponce, Puerto Rico; 18.02085°N 66.61380°W
- Official name: Acueducto Alfonso XII
- Maintained by: Municipality of Ponce, Puerto Rico

Characteristics
- Total length: 4,100 m (2.5 mi), 4,100 m (4,500 yd)
- Width: 0.52 m (1 ft 8 in) (interior conduit channel only)
- Height: 50 ft (15 m) at highest
- Capacity: 40.51 L/s (1.431 cu ft/s)

History
- Construction start: 21 August 1876
- Construction cost: $220,000 ($6.65 million in 2025 dollars
- Opened: 1880
- Closed: 1928
- Acueducto de Ponce
- U.S. National Register of Historic Places
- NRHP reference No.: 100004854
- Added to NRHP: 30 December 2019

Location
- Interactive map of Acueducto de Ponce

References
- Reference List

The Acueducto de Ponce (Ponce Aqueduct), formally Acueducto Alfonso XII, is the name of a historic 2.5-mile gravity-based water supply system in the city of Ponce, Puerto Rico. It was designed in 1875 by Timoteo Luberza and built the following years. This aqueduct was the first modern water distribution system built in Puerto Rico. The Aqueduct (or, more precisely, its conduit channel at its highest elevation point in Barrio Mameyes) was known as El Puente de los Suicidios (Bridge of the suicides). It was declared a National Historic Monument on 17 June 2015.

== Location ==
The most iconic part of the aqueduct, its reservoir, it located on the Cerro San Tomas hill, next to sector Mameyes, in the Barrio La Cantera in the city of Ponce.

External audio
- You may see Acueducto de Ponce (also includes the Mameyes Memorial) HERE

== History ==
Construction of the aqueduct was heavily promoted in the Ponce newspaper "El Fénix" by Don Eustaquio Quesada and Don Salvador Coronas. Construction started on 21 August 1876. The 1876 construction cost was of $220,000 ($6.65 million in 2025 dollars). It became operational in that year. It was completed in 1880 and it operated for 48 years—until 1928. Its construction was made possible by a generous 54,000 Spanish pesos donation from Valentín Tricoche, who also left in his will moneys for the construction of Hospital Tricoche.

== Watershed feeder system ==
The watershed for the Acueducto de Ponce water supply system consisted of about 30 square kilometers of the valley of the Rio Portugués river. Rio Portugués has its source near the Ponce-Jayuya and Ponce-Adjuntas roads. The watershed approaches the PR-123 road for the first time at kilometer 18 and crosses it at kilometers 19 and 24. In 1915, in the part of the watershed nearest the aqueduct intake there were some 50 houses, five stables, two dairies, and a coffee hacienda. The population of the area was about 50 people. For this reason there was some concern about potential contamination of the aqueduct water supply.

== Description ==
The aqueduct was 4,100 meters (2.5 mi) long, or approximately 4,442 yards. The gravity-based aqueduct was initially 3,000 meters long from the dam to the reservoir. It was later enlarged to 4,100 meters, but was eventually decommissioned, under the mayoral administration of Guillermo Vivas Valdivieso, when a new, pump-based, water supply system was inaugurated. At its highest point the aqueduct rose 50 feet high.

=== Intake dam ===
The intake dam for the aqueduct was located at Río Portugués, about 1 kilometer north of the mouth of Rio Chiquito. It was made of a low masonry wall, or diversion weir, and had very little storage capacity. There was a small pool in front of the intake, deep enough to protect it, which was screened to keep out floating debris.

=== Conduit ===
The water was carried from the intake to the reservoir in a brick conduit channel. The dimensions of the conduit channel were 0.52 meter wide by 0.55 meter deep. The conduit had a semicircular crown. The conduit ran through land covered with brush and young trees. It also ran through pasture land and old cattle yards. Further south it also passed along the side of a very steep hill and just before reaching the reservoir, it also passed through the Mameyes sector of La Cantera neighborhood.

=== Reservoir ===
The reservoir was of brick lined with cement. It was covered. It had a capacity for 2,000 cubic meters. The reservoir was divided into two compartments. The insular government at the time estimated that the reservoir held a one day's supply of water for the city residents which then consisted of a population of 35,000.

=== Distribution ===
The main water pipe into the city of Ponce made its way down Calle Atocha crossing Calle Guadalupe, Calle Victoria, Calle Vives, Calle Sol, Calle Isabel, Calle Cristina, and Calle Comercio. There was a block-by-block water distribution system in some 80 blocks, measured in an approximately even area of 9 blocks by 9 blocks. There was running water everywhere in the perimeter of Plaza Las Delicias, as well as outward from Plaza Las Delicias for at least 4 additional blocks.

== Disposition ==
With the advent of more advanced water supply systems, the aqueduct was retired in 1928, and eventually abandoned. It laid in ruins for many decades. In 2015, however, Puerto Rico senator Víctor Vasallo Anadón presented a bill in the Puerto Rico Senate to enact legislation to designate the aqueduct a historic structure worth preserving and secure funds for its preservation. On 9 June 2015, it was voted a National Historic Monument. On 17 June 2015, it was declared a National Historic Monument. It was listed on the U.S. National Register of Historic Places on 30 December 2019.

== See also ==
- Barrio Mameyes
- Old Piedras River Aqueduct: NRHP listing in San Juan, Puerto Rico
- National Register of Historic Places listings in Ponce, Puerto Rico
