= Professional Hospital Guaynabo =

Hospital in Guaynabo, Puerto Rico

Professional Hospital
- Professional Hospital Guaynabo

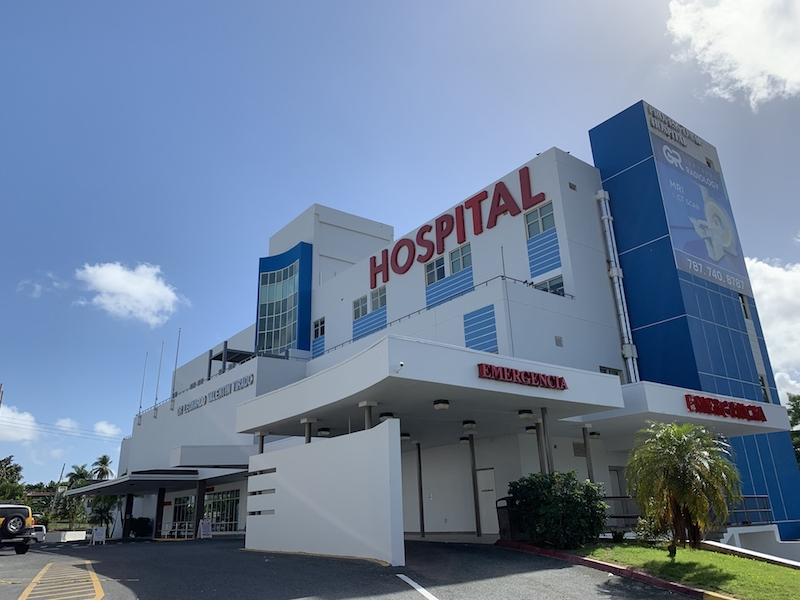

Geography
- Location: Guaynabo, Puerto Rico
- Coordinates: 18°21′45″N 66°05′52″W

Organisation
- Type: General

Services
- Beds: 202

History
- Founded: 1988

Links
- Website: www.professionalhospital.com
- Lists: Hospitals in Puerto Rico

Professional Hospital Guaynabo is a private general hospital in Guaynabo, Puerto Rico. It encompasses the Vascular Institute of Puerto Rico—site where the first vascular stent in Puerto Rico was placed. The institution has been treating vascular conditions in Puerto Rico since 1988. The hospital currently specializes in general surgery procedures, orthopedics, plastic surgery and vascular procedures, becoming the first hospital in Puerto Rico to specialize in blood circulation.

== History ==
The hospital first began as a small community hospital in the city of Manatí. It then moved, with an initial investment of $65 million, to the city of Guaynabo becoming a 202 licensed-beds project.

== Mission and purpose ==
Professional Hospital Guaynabo is organized under the laws of the Commonwealth of Puerto Rico to develop health care facilities in Puerto Rico. The organization places special emphasis on minimally invasive surgical procedures to elderly patients and preventive and therapeutic management of circulatory ailments.

Puerto Rico has one of the highest incidence rates of diabetes mellitus in the world and continues to rise. These conditions have an enormous health, economic and psychological impact on the population, principally on the elderly segment, which reflects the highest relative and absolute growth in this decade. For the advancement of less invasive and newer procedures, new technology and modern facilities must be developed.

== Location ==
Even though the municipality of Guaynabo is surrounded by a large metropolitan area, it had no hospitals within its municipal boundaries prior to Professional Hospital. For this reason, medical facilities in Guaynabo are important centers for providing health care services not only to the adjacent medical community but also to sister clinics already operating in San Juan, Bayamón and the city of Manatí. A medical office building is also being developed by Professional Hospital in Guaynabo which will include an Imaging Center.

== Vascular clinics ==
Professional Hospital has developed two outpatient circulation clinics – "Clínicas Especializadas en Circulación" (Clinics Specialized in Circulation) in Guaynabo and Manatí – to serve a patient population that covers a great portion of the northern part of the Puerto Rico. Services include preventive, diagnostic and medical treatment procedures.
