= Plaza del Mercado de Ponce =

Historic building in Ponce, Puerto Rico

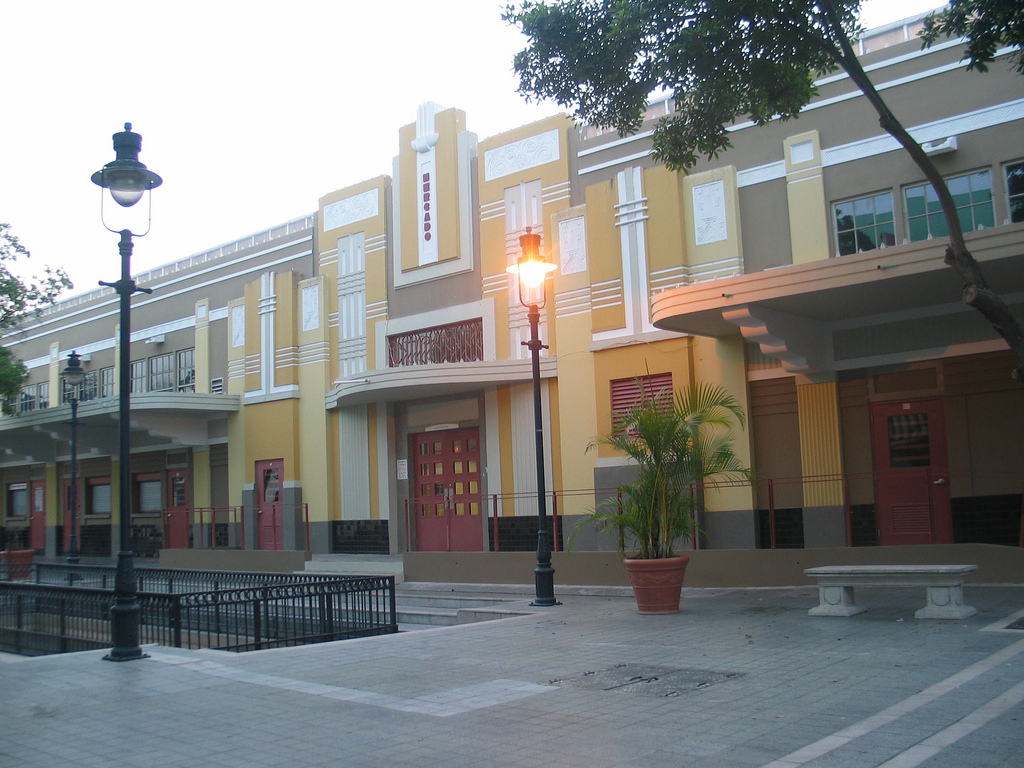
- Plaza del Mercado Isabel Segunda in Ponce, Puerto Rico

General information
- Architectural style: Neoclassical, Art Deco
- Location: Ponce Historic Zone, at the grid formed by Atocha, Estrella, Leon, and Castillo streets., Ponce, Puerto Rico
- Coordinates: 18.0146381°N 66.6134173°W
- Completed: 1863
- Client: Government of the Municipality of Ponce

Technical details
- Size: 5,200 square meters (56,000 ft^{2}) (1877 measurements)

Design and construction
- Architects: Timoteo Luberza (1863), Pedro Mendez (1941, 1989), Miguel A. Carlos (1992)
- Engineer: Timoteo Luberza

Plaza del Mercado de Ponce (English: Ponce Market Plaza) or, formally, Plaza del Mercado Isabel Segunda (often abbreviated as Plaza del Mercado Isabel II), is a historic marketplace building in Ponce, Puerto Rico. It was inaugurated in 1863 by Ponce Mayor Don Luis de Quixano. Designed by famed engineer Timoteo Luberza, it occupies a city block in the Ponce Historic Zone at the grid formed by Calle Atocha, Estrella, Leon, and Castillo streets. It has room for 65 kiosks. It was originally called Plaza del Capá.

== History ==
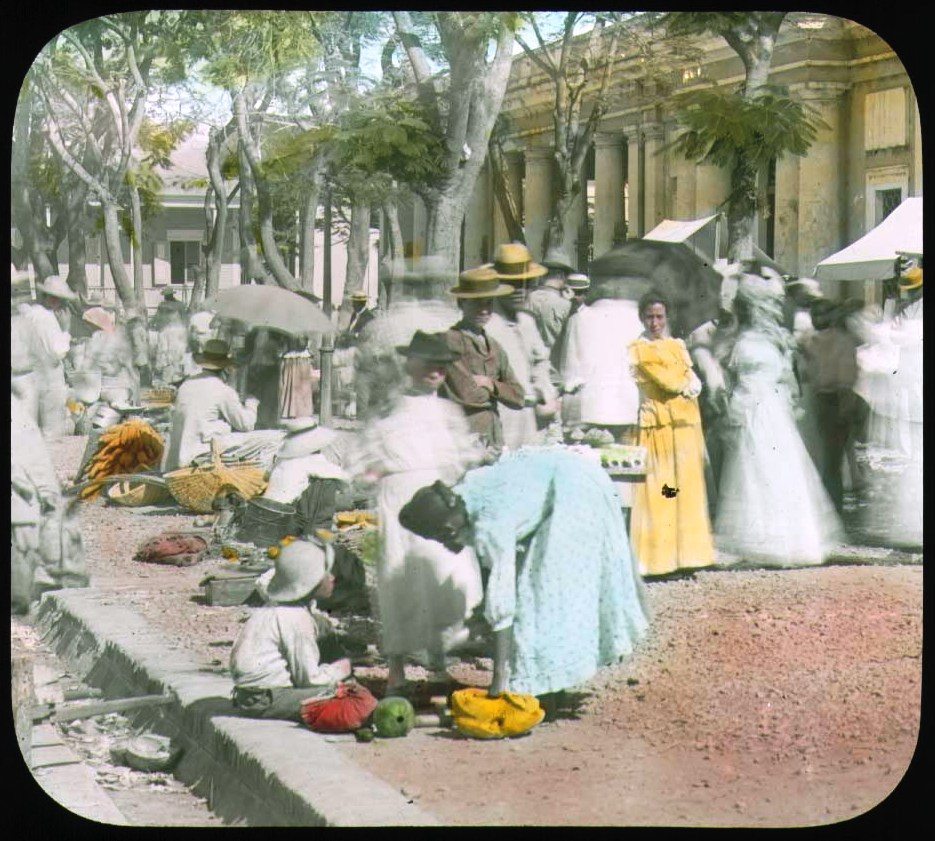
Plaza del Mercado in 1899

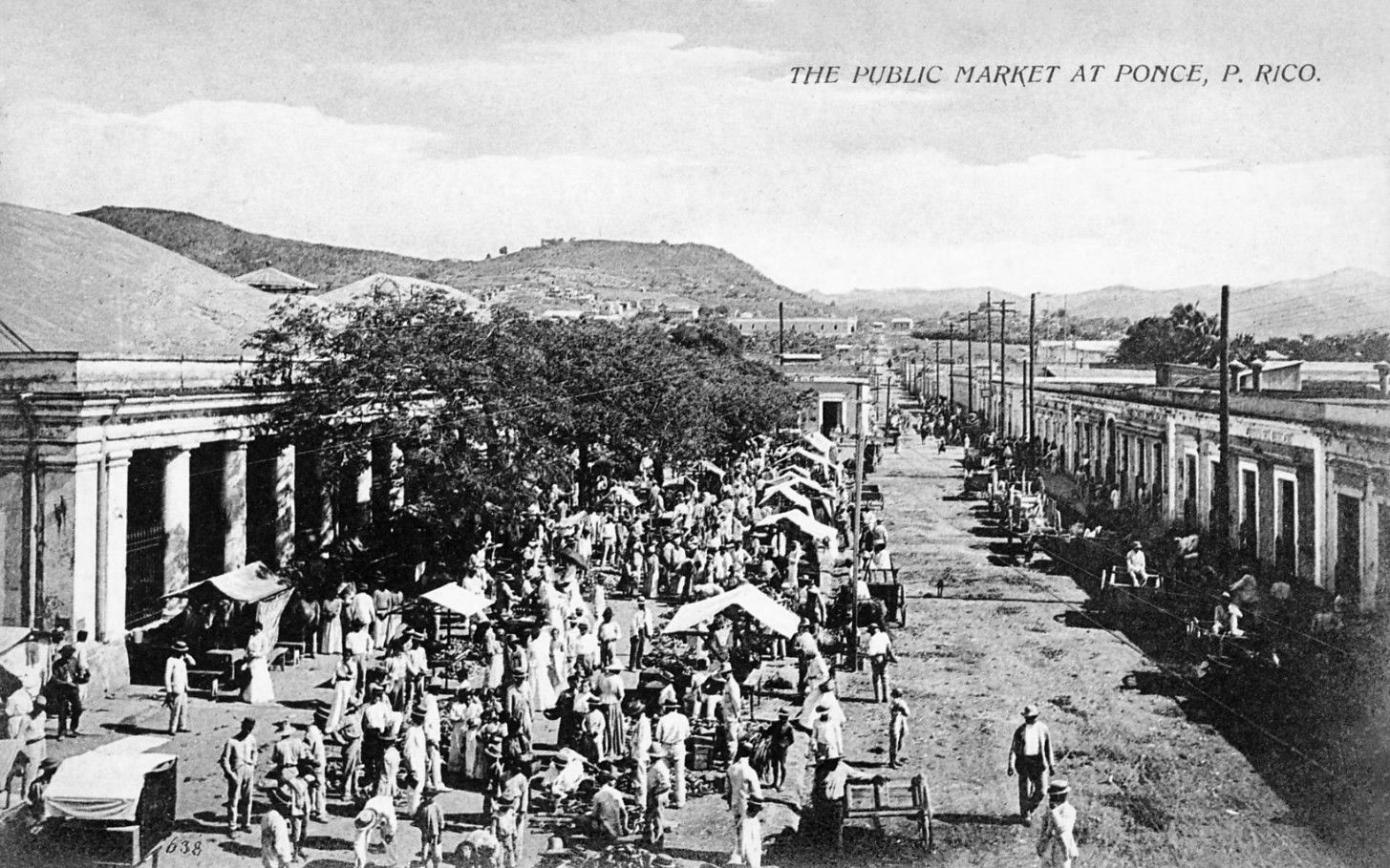
Market before 1903 enlargement

The building was erected from plans by Timoteo Luberza in 1863, who modeled it after Les Halles, the market of Paris in France. At the time it was built, it was the largest and most modern marketplace in Puerto Rico. It has undergone four major additions and/or remodelings since then: in 1903, 1941, 1980–89, and 2006.

=== 1903 Enlargement ===
In 1903 it was enlarged according to the Neoclassical design of architect Manuel V. Domenech. A meat storage was also added. Even by the early 1900s, Plaza del Mercado had enjoyed many years of heavy use and, by 1926, Plaza del Mercado Isabel II was so overcrowded that the city of Ponce built a second plaza, Mercado de las Carnes ("Meat Market"), to relieve the overcrowding at Plaza del Mercado.

=== 1941 Enlargement ===
In 1941, it was again enlarged per plans by Ponce-born architect Pedro Mendez Mercado. During the 1941 remodeling, the original structure, which was not art deco, was enhanced with an art deco facade.

=== The Juan Bigas building ===
Starting in 1981, and for the next 26 years, Plaza del Mercado shopkeepers operated out of a new building at the grid formed by Calle Guadalupe, Salud, Estrella and Mayor streets, two blocks east of the historic Plaza del Mercado Isabel II. The new building, called the Plaza del Mercado Juan Bigas building, was inaugurated in 1981 to replace the aging, but historic, Plaza del Mercado Isabel II building. It cost $10 million to build. It is the building with the largest footprint in Ponce. Inside of it are some of the ruins of the old Teatro Apolo. (Teatro Apolo was located at the corner of Calle Salud and Calle Guadalupe.) On 28 June 2010, Governor Luis Fortuño signed the Senate Resolution Number 191, transferring ownership of the Plaza del Mercado de Ponce Juan Bigas building to the Ponce Municipal Government. The Juan Bigas building had sat unused since the 1990s when the shopkeepers moved back to the remodeled Isabel II building. On 7 April 2011, the municipal government announced it would invest $10 million to remodel the Juan Bigas building and turn it into a municipal services center, dubbed "Ponce Servicios", hosting various municipal services offices. The remodeling of the old Plaza del Mercado Juan Bigas building to be used for municipal government services will occur at a cost of $6.828 million. A 27 July 2011, news report stated work on the Bigas building would commence in October 2011 at an expected cost of $15 million. A 26 June 2013 news report indicated that renovations had been completed and the first two floor of the facility would reopen by the end of July 2013. The agencies due to occupy the structure are: the Oficina de Permisos (Office of Permits), Ordenación Territorial (Office of Territorial Planning), Vivienda Municipal (Office of Municipal Housing), the Archivo Histórico de Ponce, Office of the Federal Ryan White Program and the Banco Municipal (Municipal Bank). The name of the facility is Ponce Servicios. The facility reopened as "Ponce Servicios" in August 2013.

=== 1980-1989 Remodeling ===
In 1980, the building was once more remodeled. The 1980 remodeling lasted 9 years - until 1989. Its Art Deco style was further enhanced, after the design of architect Pedro Méndez Mercado. At this point the structure was turned from a fruits-and-vegetables market plaza into a handcrafts shopping plaza. Air conditioning was added to Plaza del Mercado Isabel II in 1984 when the Pitusa supermarket moved in.

=== 1992 Remodeling ===
In 1992 Plaza del Mercado Isabell II was turned into a multi-use building that included parking, businesses, and private office space. This 1992 reconstruction was part of the Ponce en Marcha project. It was designed by architect Miguel A. Carlos and built by Vissepo Construction. In 1993 the design and building project received the Award for Building Excellence of the Puerto Rico Association of General Contractors and the Association of Pre-mixed Concrete Manufacturers.

=== 2006 Restoration to today ===
The building was restored once more in 2006 at a cost of $4 million. In August 2007, the Juan Bigas Building shopkeepers moved back to the historic Plaza del Mercado Isabel II building to occupy it once more as a fruit-and-vegetables market place.

== Uniqueness ==
"The phenomenon of this building, unique in Puerto Rico, is that despite its enlargements, its interior still preserves the original structure. Through its remodelings, its facade has shown several architectural styles, including neoclassical and art deco."

== Today ==
Today Plaza de Mercado is also used as a venue for a variety of festivals and other similar gatherings. However, in October 2010, structural and air conditioning problems were found with the newly rebuilt structure.

== See also ==
- Mercado de las Carnes
- Plaza Juan Ponce de León
