= Hospital Oncológico Andrés Grillasca =

- Asociación Lucha Contra el Cáncer de Puerto Rico

Geography
- Location: Ponce, Puerto Rico
- Coordinates: 18.03224°N 66.59250°W

Organisation
- Care system: Private
- Type: Cancer Treatment Hospital

Services
- Beds: 86

History
- Founded: 1946

Links
- Website: Website
- Lists: Hospitals in Puerto Rico

Hospital Oncológico Andrés Grillasca or, more commonly, Hospital Oncológico, is a private, nonprofit hospital in Ponce, Puerto Rico, specializing in the treatment of cancer.

== History ==
It was founded in 1946 by Asociacion Lucha Contra el Cancer. In 1962 the hospital was established on the grounds of then Centro Medico de Ponce (a.k.a. Hospital de Distrito de Ponce). In 2010, the Legislature of Puerto Rico transferred the lands occupied by Hospital Oncológico Andrés Grillasca Salas to the hospital's corporation free of cost. The hospital sits on 16 cuerdas of land. (Note: One cuerda is equivalent to 0.97 acre.)

In 2012, after falling on hard financial times, the hospital received financial assistance from the Government of Puerto Rico which kept it operating.

== Today ==
Serving 26 municipalities, geographically, the hospital serves a third of Puerto Rico. In 2010, the hospital had 28 physicians, 20 nurses, and 50 support personnel.

== See also ==
- Hospital Damas
