= Susana Centeno =

- Born: 1911 or 1912
- Died: fl. 2006
- Occupation(s): Nurse, public servant
- Years active: 1930–1961
- Employer: José Benítez Guzmán Municipal Hospital

Susana Centeno (1911/1912–fl. 2006) was a Puerto Rican practical nurse and public servant who worked at the José Benítez Guzmán Municipal Hospital in Vieques, Puerto Rico from 1930 to 1961. The hospital was renamed in her honor in 1996.

== Life ==
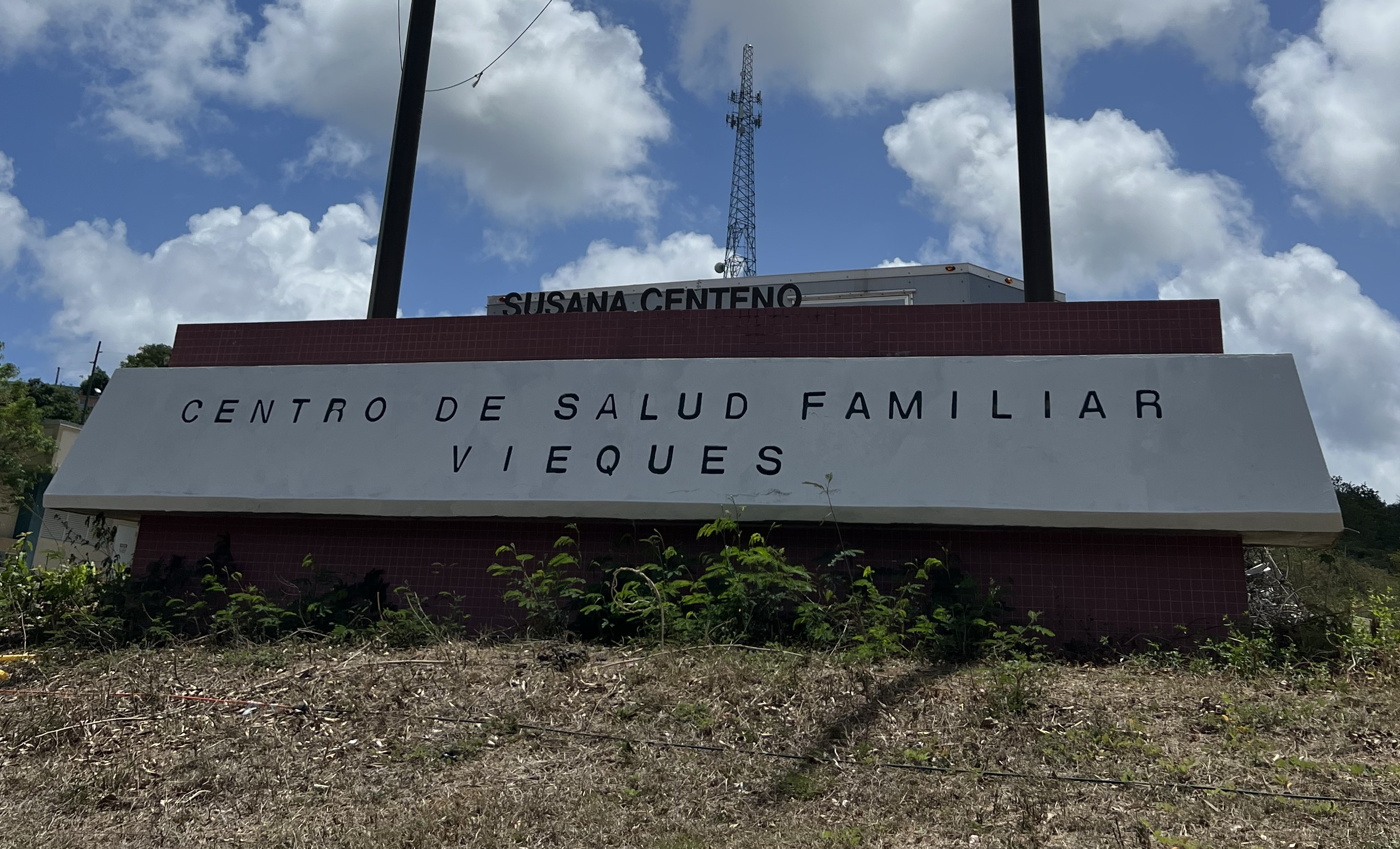
Susana Centeno Family Health Center in 2022

Susana Centeno was born in 1911 or 1912 to housewife Elisa Carrión and construction worker Arturo Centeno. She was of mixed African and European ancestry. Her early school years lacked stability due her family's frequent moves between Vieques, Puerto Rico and the main island due to her father's employment.

In 1930, Centeno began volunteering at the José Benítez Guzmán Municipal Hospital. She learned the basics of nursing and medical protocol through observation and practice. She performed a variety of duties including pulling molars, participating in surgeries, conducting minor operations, preparing corpses, delivering babies, and providing couples therapy. In 1947, she finished eighth grade and later earned high school and nursing diplomas. Centeno apprenticed under physician Leoncio Davis and other practitioners. Due in part to a shortage of medical professionals and limited governmental oversight, Centeno assumed responsibilities beyond those of a registered nurse or advanced practice nurse. On January 12, 1959, a ceremony featuring Vieques mayor Antonio Rivera Rodríguez was held to recognize Centeno's public service. She retired in 1961 and moved to Toa Baja, Puerto Rico to live with her daughter.

In 1996, the Vieques health center was renamed in Centeno's honor. The following year, she was named an Adopted Daughter and Distinguished Citizen of Toa Baja. On September 6, 2002, the maternity ward at the Susana Centeno Family Health Center was inaugurated by governor Sila María Calderón. Centeno was posthumously commemorated by Vieques mayor Dámaso Serrano in 2006.
