= Yocasta Brugal =

Puerto Rican pathologist and academic administrator

Yocasta Clara Brugal Mena is a Puerto Rican forensic pathologist and academic administrator. She is the president and dean of San Juan Bautista School of Medicine. Brugal leads the department of clinical pathology.

Brugal completed a M.D. at the University of Barcelona faculty of medicine in 1971. She specializes in pathology and forensic pathology.

She has recently participated in awarding the 2026 Dr. Yocasta Brugal Faculty Excellence in Research and Scholarly Activity Award to Dr. Linda Pérez-Laras on June 4, 2026.

She has also been a part of three publications in which she has advanced the knowlegde of medical experiences, clinical trials and academic learning.[1]
