= Susana Centeno Hospital =

Hospital in Vieques, Puerto Rico

Susana Centeno Family Health Center
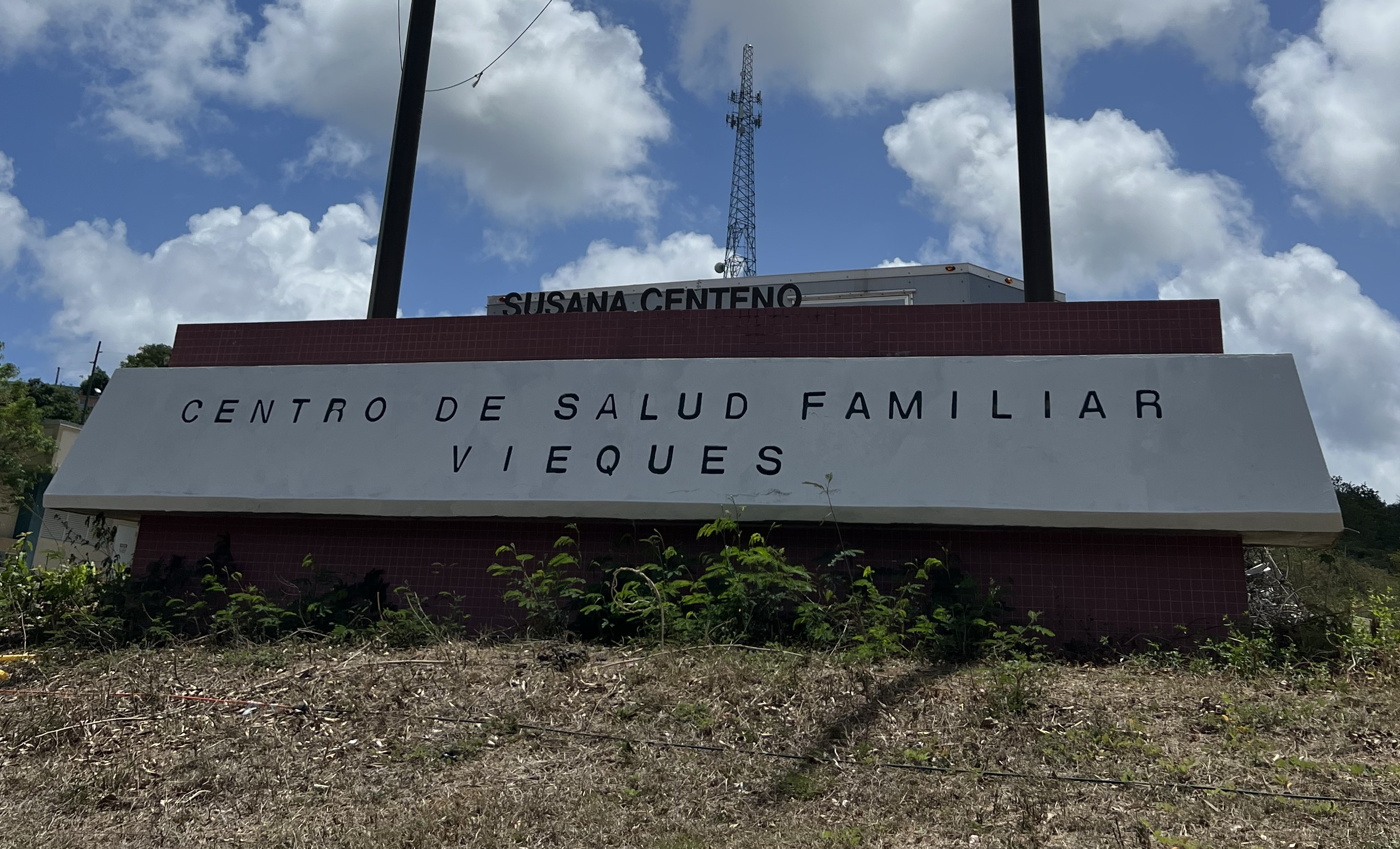

Geography
- Location: Vieques, Puerto Rico
- Coordinates: 18°8′31″N 65°26′22″W

Organisation
- Type: General

Links
- Lists: Hospitals in Puerto Rico

Susana Centeno Family Health Center (Spanish: Centro de Salud Familiar Susana Centeno, CSFSC) is the hospital in Vieques, Puerto Rico. It is administered by the Puerto Rico Department of Health. The hospital closed in 2017 due to damage sustained in Hurricane Maria. It housed the island's only maternity ward, x-ray, and dialysis center.

After many years the hospital finally opened with new facilities on September 26, 2026. The current hospital has an Emergency Room and dedicated dialysis center. In addition, it includes out patient and support services.

== Old hospital ==
After the colony of Vieques was established by Spain in 1844, a chief physician provided health services through the local government. These public health services focused on epidemics and medical care for the poor. A civilian hospital was created in 1879. Through the hospital, the municipality provided shelter, meals, medicine, nurses, and daily visits from a doctor. The sanatorium was located in barrio Cañon in front of the municipal cemetery. It was a big house build with wood and zinc planks. By the early 1910s, the sanatorium was in poor condition.

== José Benítez Guzmán Municipal Hospital ==
...to think of a maternity ward for Vieques is a fantasy. Within the realm of modern medicine, this is a project impossible to finance. A maternity ward needs specialized personnel such as an obstetrician-gynecologist, anesthesiologist (twenty-four hours), pediatrician-neonatologist, nurse anesthetist, and indispensable equipment like an incubator, respirator, blood bank and others...It is quite true that these services used to be offered in Vieques. But what is not mentioned is the high mortality and morbidity rate that these practices entailed...We have to understand that those were other times and other attitudes. Physicians could engage in improper practices and the people harmed were often conformists or did not have the malice to think about lawsuits and disputes. Nowadays a doctor must carefully weigh each step. We are in a time of lawsuits, especially against obstetrician-gynecologists, who are the target of most of them. For such reasons none of these specialists are going to work in a place that does not guarantee services and equipment conducive to an adequate practice of their profession.

Viequense ob-gyn José Luis Cintrón in the late 1990s on the challenges of maintaining a maternity ward on the island.

In the early 1910s, Carlos Benítez Castaño, a wealthy hacendado and town mayor (1910-1914), donated some of his land outside of town and supported the construction of a new hospital. The José Benítez Guzmán Municipal Hospital was established in 1913 and included doctors, nurses, and other personnel, sleeping quarters, pharmacy, mortuary, operating room, maternity ward, and other services. The hospital was named after Benítez Castaño's father. The building had several wings and wraparound verandas.

In 1930, Susana Centeno began working at the hospital as a volunteer. She retired in 1961.

In 1953, 212 births (79 percent) on Vieques took place at the hospital. By 1968, hospital births on the island increased to 99.4 percent. A study team of Naval Reserve officers headed by Captain Richard E. Young, a reservist with Naval Air Force Atlantic Fleet, visited the island in 1981 to determine which projects would benefit both the island's residents and the Navy. Vieques mayor Carlos Castano suggested that they visit the hospital. Young reported that it was in "pitiful shape...They didn't even have a typewriter that worked, and the patients waited, sometimes hours, on hard wooden benches." The Navy later donated X-ray equipment valued at $250,000. Commodore Diego E. Hernández, chief of staff for the Naval Air Force Atlantic Fleet and the senior ranking Hispanic-American in the Navy, was present at the dedication ceremonies.

In 1983, the retirement of Gloria Leguillou, a registered nurse specialized in obstetrics, resulted in a temporary closure of the maternity ward. The closure eventually became permanent. In 1985, Puerto Rican pharmaceutical firms donated approximately $40,000 worth of medicine to the Vieques municipal hospital. The same year, the Puerto Rican Department of Health and the Roosevelt Roads Naval Station oversaw an operation by the 448th Engineer Battalion to rebuild an access road and repair parts of the hospital.

== Susana Centeno Family Health Center ==
On October 25, 1996, the Vieques municipal hospital was founded. (Note: Colloquially, the word "hospital," center for diagnosis and treatment (CDT), and family health clinics are often used interchangeably. The CDT terminology was established during Pedro Rosselló's administration.) It was named after Susana Centeno a retired local practical nurse. The hospital remained closed for over a year after its inauguration. Local residents hosted a birthday celebration for the hospital. Shortly thereafter, the Susana Centeno Center for Diagnosis and Treatment (CDT) opened. It included an emergency room, a pediatrician serving as its medical director, two general practitioners, a dentist, six registered nurses, and twelve practical nurses. The CDT also hosted a laboratory. The CDT did not have a maternity ward to allow for birthing on the island.

In March 1999, the hospital was transferred from the Puerto Rico Department of Health to the municipality of Vieques. The Vieques municipality, with an operational deficit of $3,638,392 in fiscal year 1999–2000, did not have sufficient funds to run the hospital. In October 2001, the hospital was transferred from the municipality back to the department of health.

In early 1999, a group of Viequense women met and eventually founded the Vieques Women's Alliance (VWA) dedicated to advocating for the removal of the United States Navy from Vieques and improvement of reproductive rights on the island. The VWA successfully lobbied the administration of governor Sila María Calderón to support the funding of a maternity ward at the Vieques CDT. The maternity ward opened September 6, 2002. The CSFSC opened in October 2002 and was the only facility for women on the island to give birth.

By May 2013, the hospital had no skilled nursing and out patient rehabilitation facilities, nursing home, community mental health center, or ambulatory surgical center. Due to broken air conditioning systems, the CDT's X-ray machine and maternity wards have closed periodically for years. Accessibility of health services continued through 2016.

=== Hurricane Maria ===
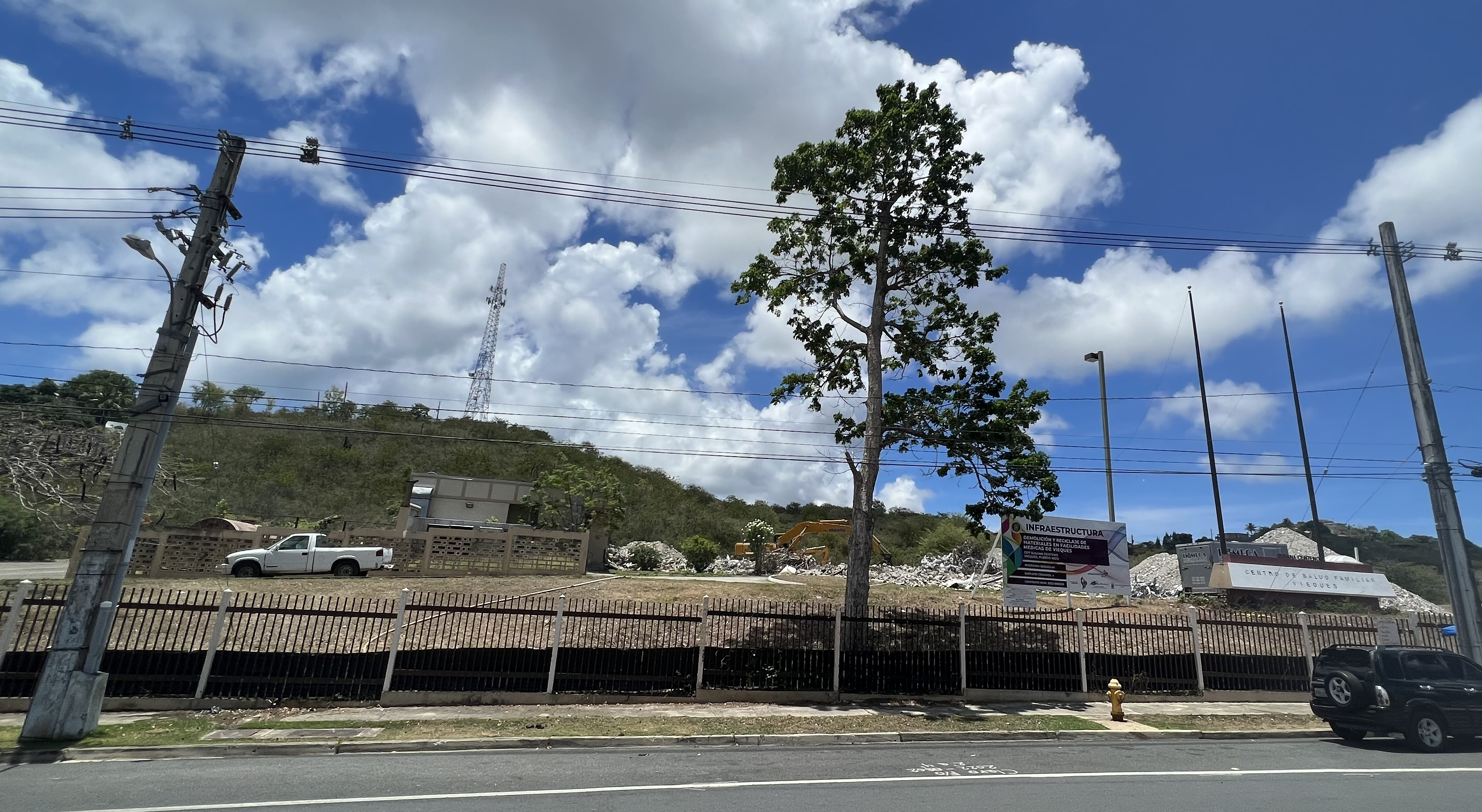
Hospital demolition in June 2022

Damage from the 2017 Hurricane Maria caused the closure of the CDT in Vieques.

Registered nurse Zaida Torres Rodriguez worked at the Vieques health center for eighteen years. By the spring of 2020, Torres was retired.

The island converted its only emergency shelter to a temporary CDT. In May 2019, members of the U.S. Congress wrote a letter to the acting Federal Emergency Management Agency (FEMA) administrator Pete Gaynor to request an explanation as to why the hospital was still closed almost two years after the hurricane. On January 21, 2020, the FEMA approved $39.5 million to help rebuild its only hospital after damage caused by Hurricane Maria. FEMA approved the funding after the Office of Management and Budget agreed to provide money to rebuild the Susan Centeno community health center based on its "replacement value."

The family of Jaideliz Moreno Ventura, 13, whose 2020 death was blamed on the lack of a functioning hospital and lifesaving medical equipment in Vieques, is suing the government for violation of human and civil rights. Funds for rebuilding the hospital were approved two weeks after Jaideliz's death, but as of January 31, 2021, it has not been rebuilt.

== New hospital ==
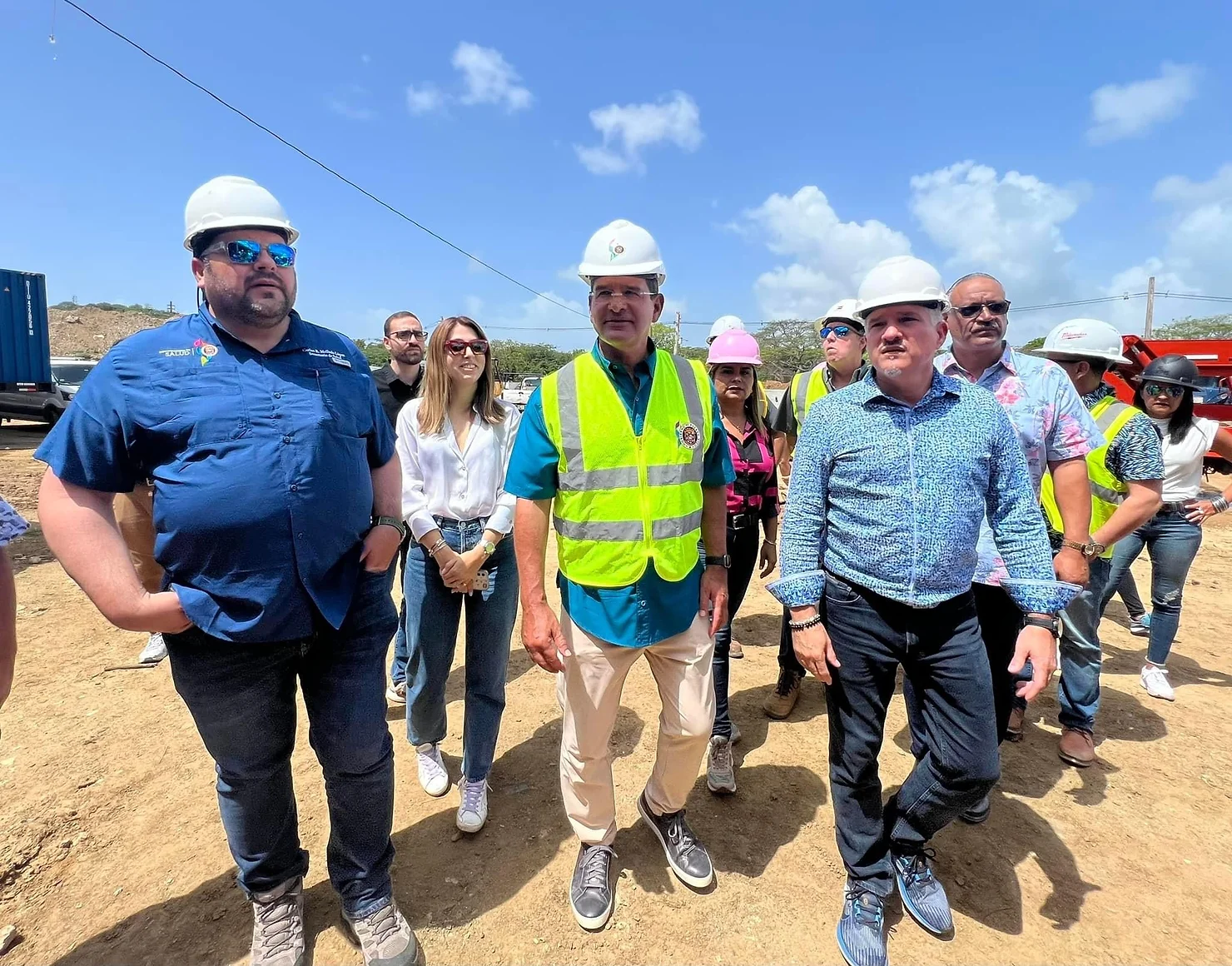
Gov. Pierluisi, center, alongside Health Secretary Mellado López, at left, and legislators and other government officials in April 2024

In August 2021, governor Pedro Pierluisi announced a project to construct a new hospital in Vieques by 2024. In May 2022, demolition of the CDT commenced. The Vieques-based Applied Engineering Group is managing the demolition which will take between 4 and 6 months. On May 18, 2022, governor Pierluisi announced several phases of the reconstruction. Phase one is set to open in 2022 and include a dialysis center and a machine room with generators, cistern, and a substation. The second phase set to end in 2023 includes the main building, a helicopter pad, emergency room, x-ray center, pharmacy, and laboratory. The last phase is scheduled for completion in 2024. The total construction costs of the new hospital is estimated at $60 million with $57 million of it coming from FEMA. Construction began in November 2023 and is expected to be complete by December 2025.

== See also ==
- List of hospitals in Puerto Rico
