= Sistema de Salud Menonita =

Geography
- Location: Puerto Rico, Puerto Rico

Organisation
- Type: Teaching

Services
- Beds: 980

History
- Founded: 1944

Links
- Website: https://www.sistemamenonita.com
- Lists: Hospitals in Puerto Rico

Sistema de Salud Menonita (Mennonite Health System) is a system of teaching hospitals and family health centers located throughout Puerto Rico.

== History ==
Sistema de Salud Menonita was founded in 1944 by Mennonite missionaries in the city of Aibonito, Puerto Rico and has since grown into a major non-profit healthcare network in Puerto Rico. It includes six hospitals across various municipalities: Aibonito, Cayey, Caguas, Humacao, Guayama, and Ponce, as well as a mental health facility (CIMA) in Aibonito.

It operates with a mission rooted in the values of the Mennonite Church, offering services such as emergency care, surgery, internal medicine, pediatrics, obstetrics and gynecology, psychiatry, and behavioral health. The organization is known for its commitment to underserved populations and integrates spiritual care with medical treatment.

Over the years, the network has expanded through acquisition and development of existing facilities, such as the San Juan Bautista Hospital (Caguas) in 2011 and the Hospital San Cristóbal (Ponce) in 2022.
