= Hospital Metropolitano Dr. Pila =

- MetroPavia Heath Systems
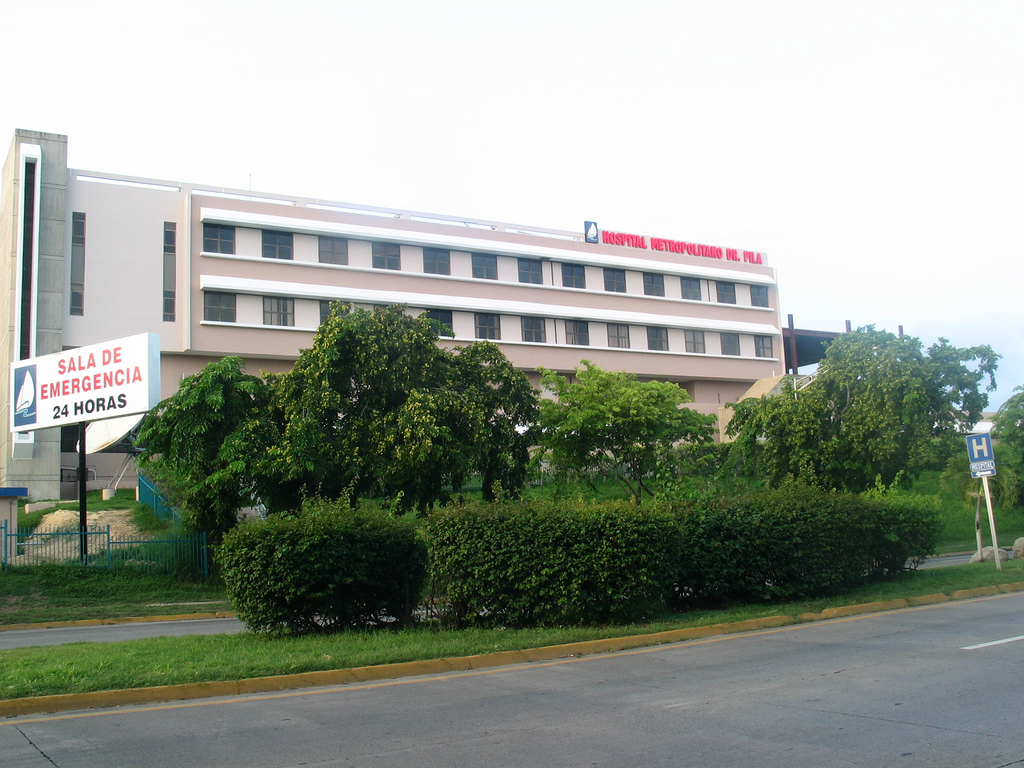
- Hospital Metropolitano Dr. Pila on Avenida Las Americas, Barrio Canas Urbano, Ponce, Puerto Rico

Geography
- Location: Ponce, Puerto Rico
- Coordinates: 18.00359°N 66.61063°W

Organisation
- Type: General

Services
- Beds: 212

History
- Founded: 1925

Links
- Website: https://hmdrpila.com/
- Lists: Hospitals in Puerto Rico

Hospital Metropolitano Dr. Pila or, more commonly, Hospital Dr. Pila is a hospital in Ponce, Puerto Rico.

== History ==
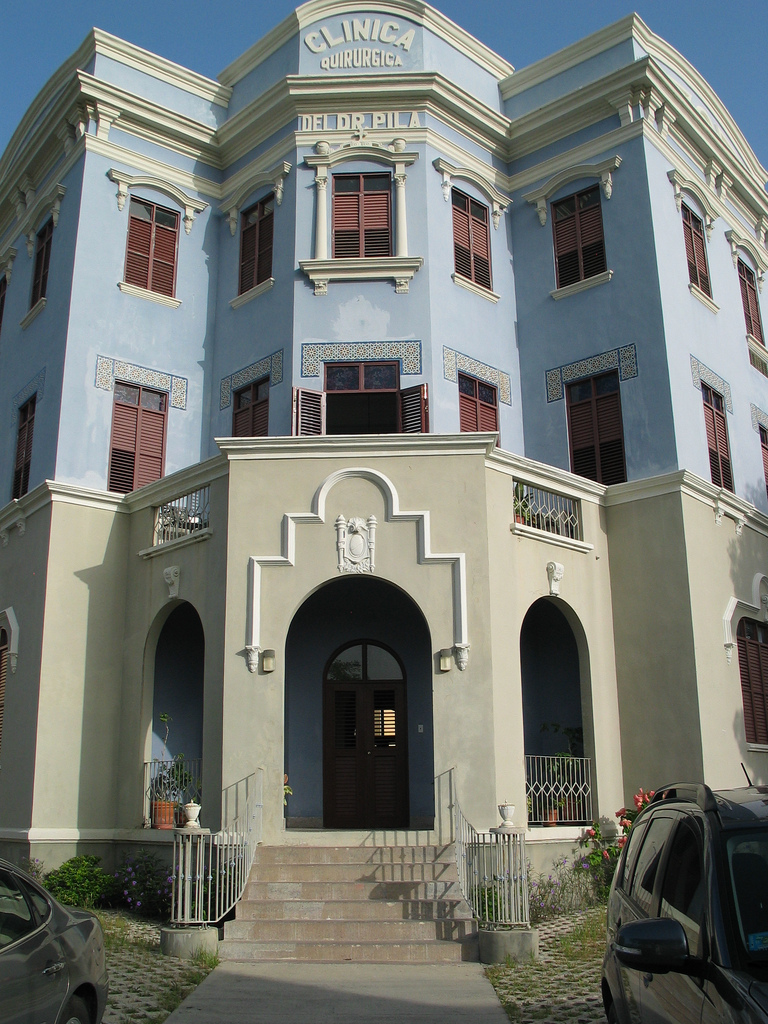
Main entrance to the old Dr. Pila Clinic/Hospital (now an apartment building) looking northwest in Barrio Primero, Ponce.

The hospital was founded in 1925 in by Dr. Manuel de la Pila Iglesias, a Spaniard from Cádiz, Spain, who had been raised in Ponce. Prior to founding Hospital Dr. Pila, he worked for the municipal government at Ponce's Tricoche Municipal Hospital and at the private Hospital San Lucas both in Ponce. He had also been medical director at the Hospital de Damas, also in Ponce. The hospital was founded as a small medical clinic; it has since grown considerably. It was originally named "Clinica Quirurgica del Dr. de la Pila Iglesias" (Surgical Clinic of Dr. de la Pila Iglesias). It was located in the now Ponce Historic Zone at the northwest corner of Marina and Jobos streets in Ponce. Between 1980 and 1983, the Ponce Municipal Government, seeking to relocate Hospital Tricoche to a more accessible and spacious quarters, built new facilities on Avenida Las Americas (PR-163). Once built, however, the government could not appropriate the necessary funds to equip and open its new hospital building and agreed to sell the new facility to the Hospital Dr. Pila corporation, which moved into the new facilities three years later. In 1986, Hospital Dr. Pila left its Calle Jobos and Calle Marina location and moved to these new facilities on Avenida Las Americas (PR-163).

== Pavia Health Systems ==
In May 2010 Pavia Health Systems purchased the hospital for $32 million. The hospital had filed for bankruptcy in August 2007; it owed $50 million. Metro Pavia started operating Hospital Dr. Pila in early 2010. Metro Pavia owns 12 other hospitals. It was subsequently renamed "Hospital Metropolitano Dr. Pila".

== Today ==
The hospital has over 300 employees. It is seeking to specialize in surgery and pediatric care. Its executive director is Jose Cora Izquierdo.

== See also ==
- List of hospitals in Ponce, Puerto Rico
