= Valentín Tricoche =

Puerto Rican philanthropist

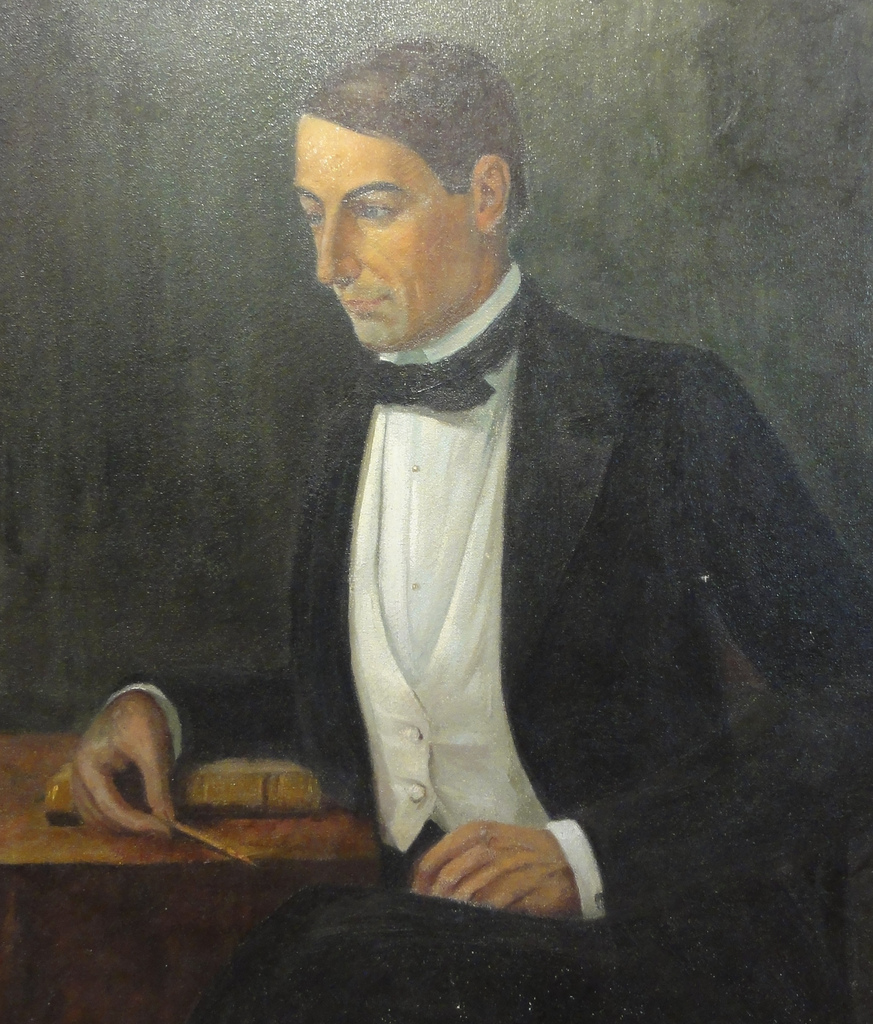
- Valentín Tricoche, circa 1850
- Born: ca. 1800; Puerto Rico
- Died: 1863; Ponce, Puerto Rico
- Occupations: Landowner, Hacendado

Valentín Tricoche (c. 1800 – 1863) was a Puerto Rican land owner and philanthropist from Ponce, Puerto Rico. He is best remembered for his generous donation that made possible the building of Hospital Tricoche.

== Early years ==
Valentin Tricoche was born in Puerto Rico around 1800.

== Landowner ==
He became a wealthy land owner in Ponce with lands on the western bank of Rio Bucana which included lands with a stone mine. He also owned a significant amount of land in barrio Segundo, north-west of the city of Ponce proper, which he later donated for the construction of a hospital and shelter.

== Philanthropist ==
Tricoche made possible the establishment of the "Albergue Caritativo Tricoche" (English: Tricoche Charitable Shelter) in 1878 thanks to an endowment he left in his will to the city of Ponce. The funds were to be used for the construction of a shelter-hospital for the poor and needy of Ponce. The hospital came to be known as Hospital Tricoche. Tricoche also made possible the construction of Ponce's Alfonso XII Aqueduct. Tricoche donated 82,970 Spanish pesos to the city, of which 47,300 Spanish pesos were used to build the hospital. The remaining money was used to build the city's aqueduct. He saw the aqueduct as an investment and his plan was that money obtained from the sale of water to city residents and local businesses and industry could be used for the maintenance of the hospital.

== Death and honors ==
Valentín Tricoche died in 1863. His remains were laid to rest at the hospital that bears his name. A plaque at the Panteón Nacional Román Baldorioty de Castro states Valentin Tricoche is buried at the Panteón, but upon construction of the hospital 22 years later (in 1885), his remains were moved to the hospital site where they still remain today.

On 7 March 2003, the Legislative Assembly of Puerto Rico approved Senate Bill 1812 declaring November 15 of each year as “Philanthropy Day,” to acknowledge and promote valuable and generous philanthropic action of citizens on behalf of the People of Puerto Rico. It declared that "the Spanish gentleman, Mr. Valentín Tricoche, to mention an example of the past, represents the power of philanthropy and civic value of those who practice the same. Don Valentín provided the city of Ponce with an important public hospital that carries his name, as well as the Alfonso XII aqueduct, a beautiful structure that still exists today, and which, for many years, served the southern population."

== See also ==
- Ponce, Puerto Rico
- List of Puerto Ricans
