= List of hospitals in Puerto Rico =

The following is a list of hospitals in Puerto Rico.

List of Hospitals in Puerto Rico
Name	City	Beds
Administrative Medical Services	San Juan	68
Ashford Presbyterian Community Hospital	San Juan	175
Auxilio Mutuo Hospital of Puerto Rico	San Juan	460
Bayamón Medical Center	Bayamón	253
Bayamón Regional Hospital	Bayamón	102
Bella Vista Hospital	Mayagüez	183
Cardiovascular Center of Puerto Rico and the Caribbean	San Juan	164
Caribbean Medical Center	Fajardo	42
Centro Medico del Noreste	Fajardo	150
Centro Medico del Turabo	Humacao	64
Doctors' Center Hospital Bayamón	Bayamón	146
Doctors' Center Hospital	Manatí	258
Doctors' Community Hospital	San Juan	129
Doctors’ Center Hospital San Fernando de la Carolina	Carolina	109
HIMA-San Pablo Cupey	San Juan	70
HIMA-San Pablo Hospital-Bayamón	Bayamón	336
Hospital Damas	Ponce	207
Hospital Buen Samaritano	Aguadilla	124
Hospital de la Concepción	San Germán	186
Hospital Episcopal San Lucas	Ponce	136
Hospital General Castañer	Lares	33
Hospital I. González Martínez	San Juan	57
Hospital Menonita Aibonito	Aibonito	150
Hospital Menonita Caguas Dr. Eduardo Garrido Morales	Caguas	240
Hospital Menonita Cayey	Cayey	262
Hospital Menonita Guayama	Guayama	116
Hospital Menonita Humacao	Humacao	71
Hospital Metropolitano de la Montaña	Utuado	47
Hospital Metropolitano Dr. Pila	Ponce	107
Hospital Metropolitano Dr. Susoni	Arecibo	120
Hospital Metropolitano San Germán	San Germán	65
Hospital Metropolitano, Guaynabo	San Juan	147
Hospital Pavia Arecibo	Arecibo	172
Hospital Pavia Caguas	Caguas	440
Hospital Pavia de Hato Rey	San Juan	160
Hospital Pavia Santurce	San Juan	199
Hospital Pavia Yauco	Yauco	112
Hospital Perea, Mayagüez	Mayagüez	118
Hospital San Antonio	Mayagüez	0
Hospital San Carlos Borromeo	Moca	106
Hospital San Cristóbal	Ponce	157
Hospital San Francisco	San Juan	125
Hospital San Lucas, Ponce	Ponce	315
Manatí Medical Center	Manatí	251
Mayagüez Medical Center	Mayagüez	192
Professional Hospital Guaynabo	Guaynabo	202
Ryder Memorial Hospital	Humacao	167
San Jorge Hospital	San Juan	167
San Juan Municipal Hospital	San Juan	174
University District Hospital	San Juan	215
University of Puerto Rico Hospital, Dr. Federico Trilla	Carolina	204
VA Caribbean Healthcare System	San Juan	348
Wilma N. Vázquez Medical Center	Vega Baja	120
Susana Centeno Hospital	Vieques	

== See also ==
- List of hospitals in the United States
- List of hospitals in Ponce, Puerto Rico
