= Centro Médico Episcopal San Lucas =

- Grupo Episcopal San Lucas
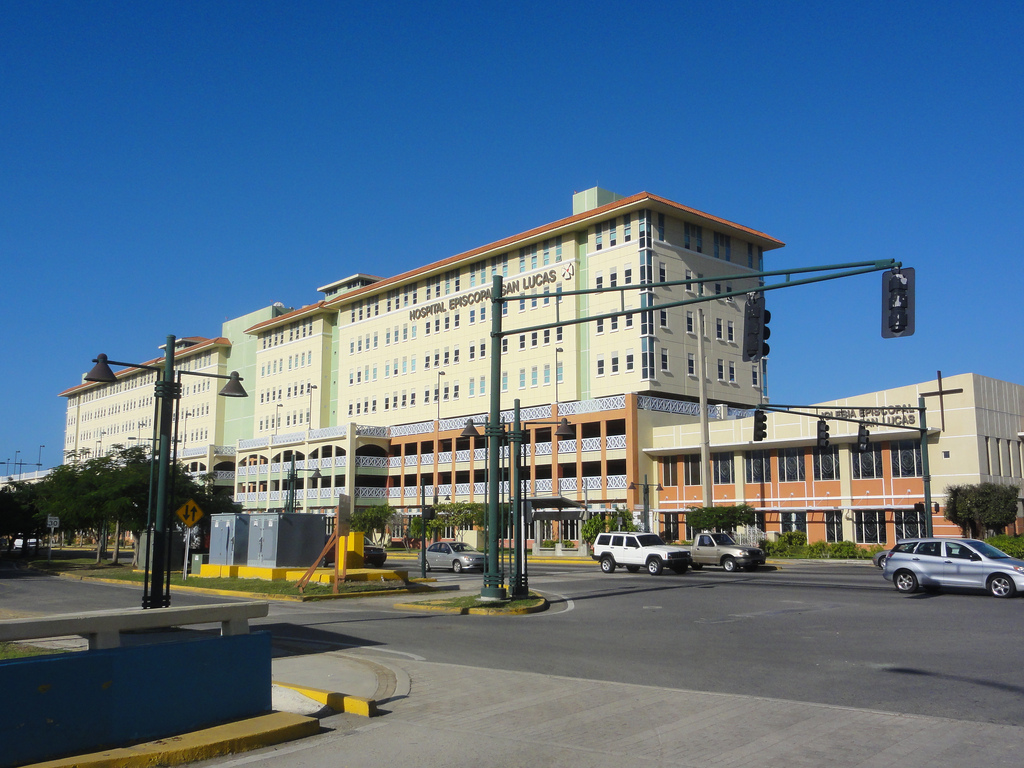

Geography
- Location: Ponce, Puerto Rico
- Coordinates: 18.03072°N 66.59399°W

Organisation
- Type: General

Services
- Beds: 287

History
- Founded: 1907

Links
- Website: http://www.ssepr.com/
- Lists: Hospitals in Puerto Rico

Centro Médico Episcopal San Lucas, commonly known as Hospital San Lucas, is a hospital in Ponce, Puerto Rico.

== History ==
Hospital San Lucas was founded in 1907 by the Puerto Rico Episcopal Church. It was located on a hill in barrio Segundo in the Clausells sector of Ponce, on the north side of Calle Guadalupe, near Calle Petardos. In the first half of the 2000s, the Government of Puerto Rico privatized all of its hospitals, and Grupo Episcopal San Lucas, needing to enlarge the facilities of its hospital, bought the Government's Hospital de Distrito de Ponce (Note: At the time of the purchase, Hospital de Distrito de Ponce had actually been renamed by the Puerto Rico Government to "Hospital Regional Dr. José N. Gándara, in honor of the late Ponce physician. (Carmelo Rosario Natal. "Ponce en Su Historia Moderna: 1945-2002." Gobierno Municipal de Ponce. First Edition. 2003. Pages 246, 248-249, 288 and 332.)) (Ponce District Hospital). Hospital de Distrito was located on Avenida Tito Castro (PR-14), on a land lot of 241.25 cuerdas that stretched from Barrio Machuelo Abajo to Barrio Machuelo Arriba. Hospital San Lucas moved some of its departments there at that time. The hospital on Calle Guadalupe was renamed Hospital San Lucas I, and the hospital on PR-14 was named Hospital San Lucas II. In the mid-2000s, Grupo Episcopal San Lucas enlarged the facilities on Avenida Tito Castro and by the end of the decade it centralized everything on Avenida Tito Castro, vacating entirely the old structure on Calle Guadalupe. Grupo Episcopal San Lucas also owned Hospital Cristo Redentor in Guayama until it was acquired by Sistema de Salud Menonita in 2017.

=== Hospital de Distrito de Ponce ===
Starting in the late 1920s, Puerto Rico experienced the development and building of public general hospitals intended to serve the health and medical needs of multiple neighboring municipalities. The first such "Hospital de Distrito" (District Hospital) was inaugurated on 5 October 1929, in the Clausells neighborhood of barrio Segundo in Ponce to serve the health and medical needs of Ponce and 37 of its surrounding municipalities. It was located on Calle Victoria at the T junction with Calle Distrito (so named because of the new hospital). Hospital de Distrito de Ponce's first medical director was Dr. Osvaldo Goyco who shared his time with Dr. Rafael Lopez Nussa. The hospital's first patient was Otilia Echevarria, a woman from Peñuelas, who was admitted to the hospital on 23 October 1929. In 1955, Hospital de Distrito moved to a new and larger campus located on the north side of Puerto Rico Highway 14 (aka, Carretera Central, and today -2015- Avenida Tito Castro) in barrio Machuelo Abajo. Hospital de Distrito operated at Avenida Tito Castro until the early 2000s, when the property was purchased by Grupo Hospital San Lucas. Most of the grounds and buildings of Hospital Distrito came to be occupied by Hospital San Lucas after the privatization of public hospitals that took place in Puerto Rico in the 2000s. One of the outlying buildings of Hospital de Distrito, however, became Hospital Oncológico Andrés Grillasca. Another one of outlying buildings of the former hospital now -2015- serves as juvenile detention center.

== Today ==
On 15 June 2011, the hospital opened a new burns unit. The hospital's CEO is Gillermo Martin Jimenez, and its director is Pedro Barez. The organization also has an Emergency Room in the El Tuque sector of barrio Canas. The institution's medical director is Jerano Scarano Garcia.

In July 2011, the hospital stopped honoring the Humana "Mi Salud" health care insurance plan on the grounds that it was unfair as compared to the payments made to the San Juan area hospitals. In December 2011, after five months not honoring the Humana health care insurance plan, the hospital management and Humana came to an agreement whereby the hospital would start honoring the Humana plan again, effective 1 January 2012.

In 2019, the institution was renamed Centro Médico San Lucas.

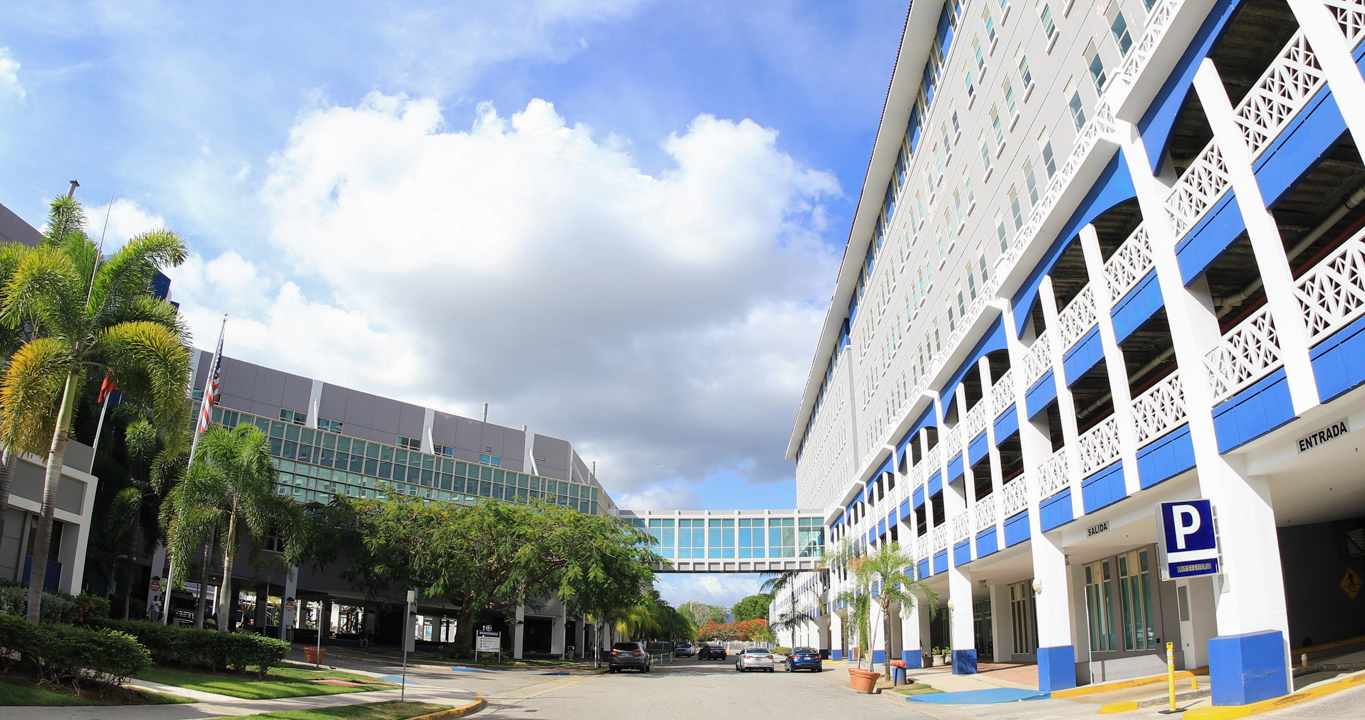
Main artery at Centro Médico Episcopal San Lucas
