= Albergue Caritativo Tricoche =

Historic building located in Ponce, Puerto Rico

- U.S. National Register of Historic Places
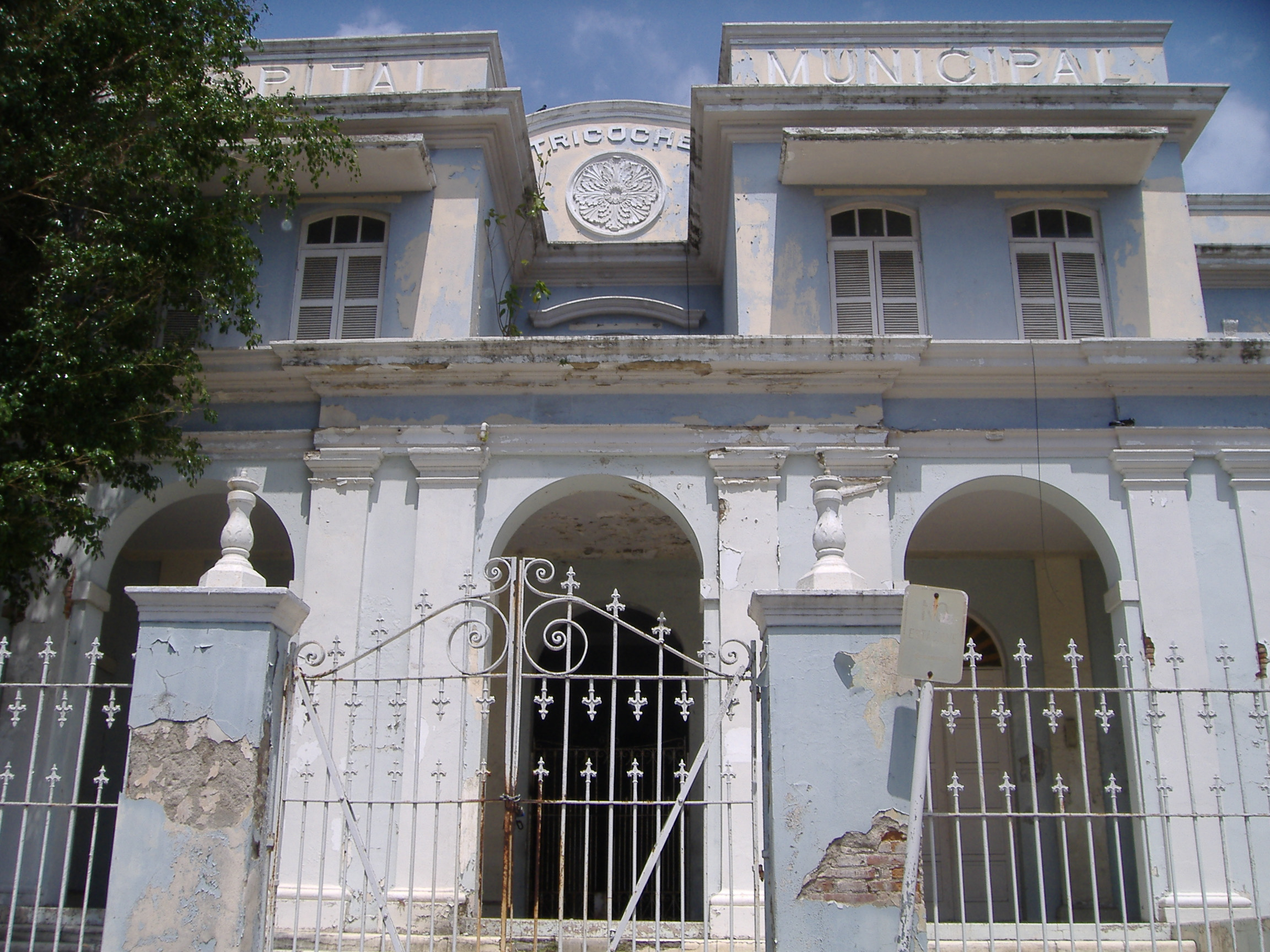

- Location within Puerto Rico
- Location: At the grid formed by Arenas (N), Tricoche (S), Bertoly (E), and Union (W) streets Ponce, Puerto Rico
- Coordinates: 18°01′00″N 66°36′55″W
- Area: 1.3 acres (0.53 ha)
- Built: 30 May 1873 to 11 December 1878
- Architect: Julio Vizcarrondo; Spanish Royal Corps of Engineers.
- Architectural style: Neoclassical and 19th Century Civil Architecture
- MPS: 19th Century Civil Architecture in Ponce TR
- NRHP reference No.: 87000769
- Added to NRHP: 14 May 1987

Albergue Caritativo Tricoche or Hospital Tricoche (English: Tricoche Charitable Shelter or Tricoche Hospital) is a historic building located on Calle Tricoche street in Ponce, Puerto Rico, in the city's historic district. It was designed by the Spanish Royal Corps of Engineers. The architecture consists of 19th-century civil architecture. When built in 1878, "it held the top spot among public building in Puerto Rico," based on its size and beauty.

The hospital was named after Valentin Tricoche, a 19th-century philanthropist and land owner in Ponce with lands on the western bank of Rio Bucana which included lands with a stone mine. Valentin Tricoche left moneys in his will for the construction of the hospital.

Construction started on 30 May 1873, it was delivered to the Municipal government by the Spanish Royal Corps of Engineers in September 1876, and opened to the public on 11 December 1878. The structure was built articulated in the Classical revival style. By 1885, the hospital was expanded with an annex which was named "Hospital Civil de Ponce", to differentiate it from the original hospital built with funds from Valentin Tricoche.

The historic structure was listed on the U.S. National Register of Historic Places on 14 May 1987.

== History ==
The "Albergue Caritativo Tricoche" (Tricoche Charitable Shelter) was founded in 1878 thanks to an endowment to the City of Ponce left by Mr. Valentin Tricoche in his will. These funds were to be used for the construction of a shelter-hospital for the poor and needy of Ponce.

Just 7 years after its opening, by 1885, the hospital had been such a success there was no longer enough room for the growing population of the city of Ponce, so an annex was started. It was named "Hospital Civil" to differentiate it from the original structure built with funds from Mr. Valentin's will. Ermelindo Salazar, Bartolo Mayol, and Francisco Maria Franceschi, headed a drive for the collection of popular funds to build the new annex, but enough funds were collected to build just one wing of the annex. Construction of the entire annex structure did not complete until 1896.

By 1885 the municipality had completed a one-story neoclassical style structure that covered an entire urban block. This building remained unchanged until the 1918 earthquake which damaged part of the southern side.

The reconstruction of this side was completed in 1928. During this reconstruction a second story was added to the south side. The architectural vocabulary used for this addition was similar to the 1885 construction. The first floor and main entrance were restored to their original shape.

Since then alterations to the structure have been minimal and mostly due to new regulations by the Department of Health or to serve the community better. The main alteration to the structure was the addition of a new emergency entrance on the southern side on the Bertoly Street facade. The addition did not contribute to the value of the property but neither did it hinder the structure's architectural integrity since it was designed and built with a compatible architectural facade. This was also true of the 1928 second floor, which was clearly separated from the 1885 construction by means of visually acceptable wall.

Hospital Tricoche served the Ponce community since 1878, and closed in 1986. "In its 108-year history the hospital gave the best free-of-cost medical attention available to the poor and needy in the city of Ponce."

In 1972 the Municipality adopted a resolution to rebuild the hospital but, after additional consideration, the plan was abandoned in 1974 in favor of building a new facility away from congestion and with sufficient space for parking. Between the mid 1970s and early 1980s, a new hospital facility was built on Avenida Las Americas. Once built, however, the municipal government could not appropriate the necessary funds to equip and open its new hospital building and, in 1984, agreed to sell the new facility to the Hospital Dr. Pila corporation for $10.37 million, which moved into the new facilities three years later. Tricoche Hospital shut down in 1999, and sits unused since.

== Physical appearance and description ==
Hospital Tricoche occupies an entire urban block bounded by Calle Arenas on the north, Calle Tricoche on the south, Calle Bertoly on the east, and Calle Union on the west. It is located a few blocks north of Ponce's main square.

The oldest records found indicate that the structure was built in 1885 consisting of a one-story building organized around two identical anterior courtyards. This original spatial distribution is still preserved today. The southern half was altered in 1928 after the 1918 earthquake damaged part of this side. During this remodeling a second story was added to this half. This southern facade is set back from the street by a fence and front yard. Its main element is the entrance portico articulated by flat tuscan pilasters and three arches, the central one slightly protruding to the front (This portico is part of the original 1885 construction). Over the portico, separated by cornice and parapet with the building's name in sans serif letters. Other decorative elements at this level include overhangs, a segmental round cornice over the recessed center window, louvered casement windows with segmental round openings and plain glass transoms and a rosette on top of the center recess between the two volumes. In contrast, the first floor of this south facade presents large rectangular windows with wide planar moldings and a simple cornice with a segmental pyramidal profile on the top molding, a cornice and rectangular windows with false segmental arch crowned by an equally false keystone all part of the original 1885 construction.

The rear half of the building conserves the original one-story configuration with a repetition of rectangular openings surrounded by wide planar moldings and top cornices. Crowning the center bay of the north (Calle Arenas) facade there is a simple triangular pediment with the date "1885" on top. The Calle Arenas street facade presents a certain rhythm in its treatment of pilasters and bays: two pilasters flank each of the central ones, including the one with the pediment, are flanked and separated by a total of six more pilasters. Wherever the pilasters occur on this facade, the wall is slightly set off to the front. The bottom of this rear part is lifted on a podium and the pilasters are surmounted by an entablure with a very simple frieze and architrave.

The corners on this rear part of the building are rounded, a somewhat unusual condition for corners in buildings of this type of architecture. After a recent remodeling, most windows and doors were finished in near-duplicative (usually louvered casement) designs. The new annex on the side features arched openings to the street and has glass fenestration. This addition does not contribute to the property's architectural value but due to its disposition and volume it does not harm the main structure's integrity either. Even with the 1928 alterations, the building "is still a magnificent example of Spanish architecture in Ponce and of the neoclassical style".

== Recent developments ==
In 2009, Ponce mayor Francisco Zayas Seijo reported that $1 million had been used by the municipality to remove toxic materials from the Hospital, and was optimistic that the inversion would lead to the opening of the hospital.

In the summer of 2019, the Ponce Municipal Legislature approved a resolution for the lease or sale of the structure.
