= Hospital Damas =

Teaching hospital in Ponce, Puerto Rico

- Hermanas de la Caridad San Vicente de Paul
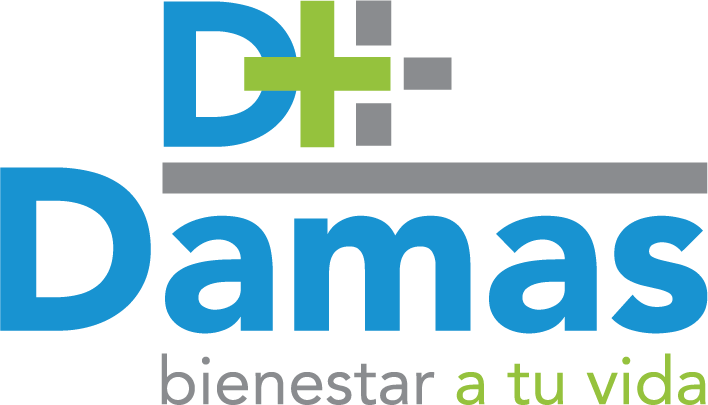

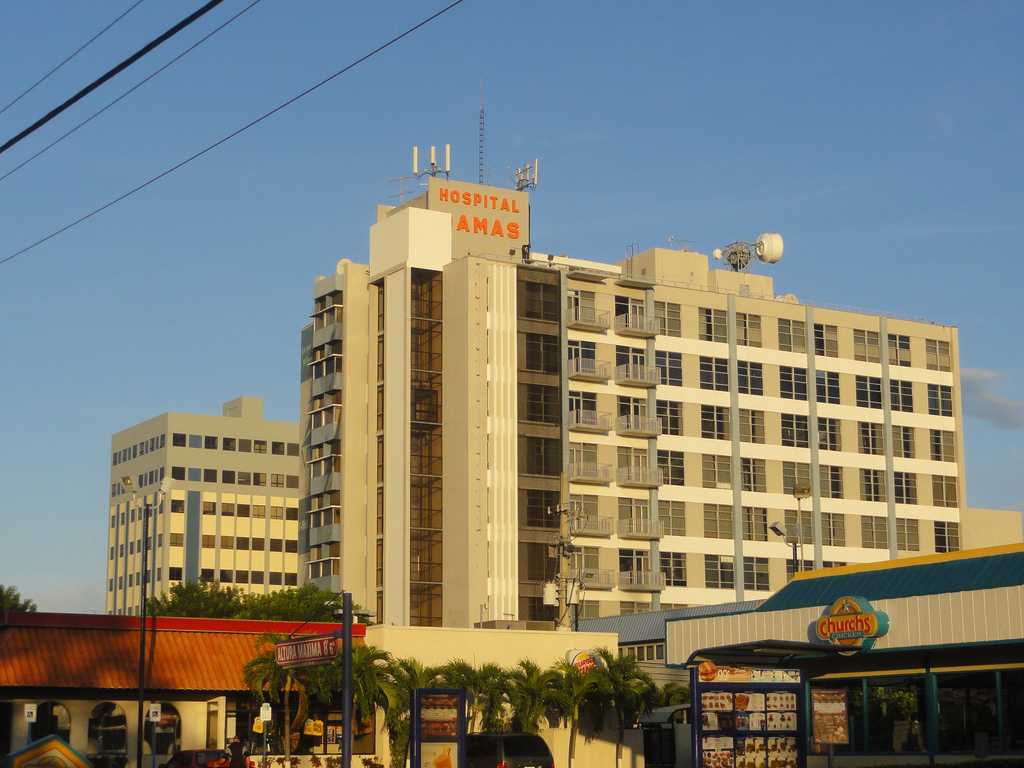
- Hospital Damas, on the Ponce Bypass, Ponce, Puerto Rico

Geography
- Location: Ponce, Puerto Rico
- Coordinates: 17°59′49.68″N 66°37′03.98″W

Organisation
- Type: Teaching

Services
- Beds: 331

History
- Founded: 1863

Links
- Website: http://www.hospitaldamas.com/
- Lists: Hospitals in Puerto Rico

Hospital Damas, formerly called Santo Asilo de Damas, is a 331-bed teaching hospital in Ponce, Puerto Rico.

== History ==
Hospital Damas was founded in 1863 as Santo Asilo de Damas by Sister Francisca Paz Cabrera, and it was attended to by the group known as Siervas de Maria (Servants of Mary) since 1891. The 1913 work by Eduardo Neumann Gandia "Verdadera y Autentica Historia de la Ciudad de Ponce" states that the name of the group of ladies that founded the institution and cared for the sick was Asociación de Señoras Damas del Santo Asilo de Ponce, roughly "Association of Gentle Ladies of the Holy Asylum of Ponce". Ernesto Colón Yordán served as its medical director from 1953 until his designation as Secretary of Health of Puerto Rico in 1968.

The hospital was located in downtown Ponce but on 6 May 1973 it moved to its current location at a new 10-story tower on the north side of the Ponce Bypass. The original location of Damas, as the hospital is oftentimes called, is now home to Parque Urbano Dora Colón Clavell.
