= Serrallés =

Serrallés may refer to:

- Castillo Serrallés, a mansion in Ponce, Puerto Rico, now a sugar cane history museum
- Destilería Serrallés, a distillery in Mercedita, Puerto Rico, makers of Don Q rums
- Juan Serrallés Colón, founder of Hacienda Mercedita, and Destilería Serrallés
