= Casa Rosita Serrallés =

Historic building in Ponce, Puerto Rico

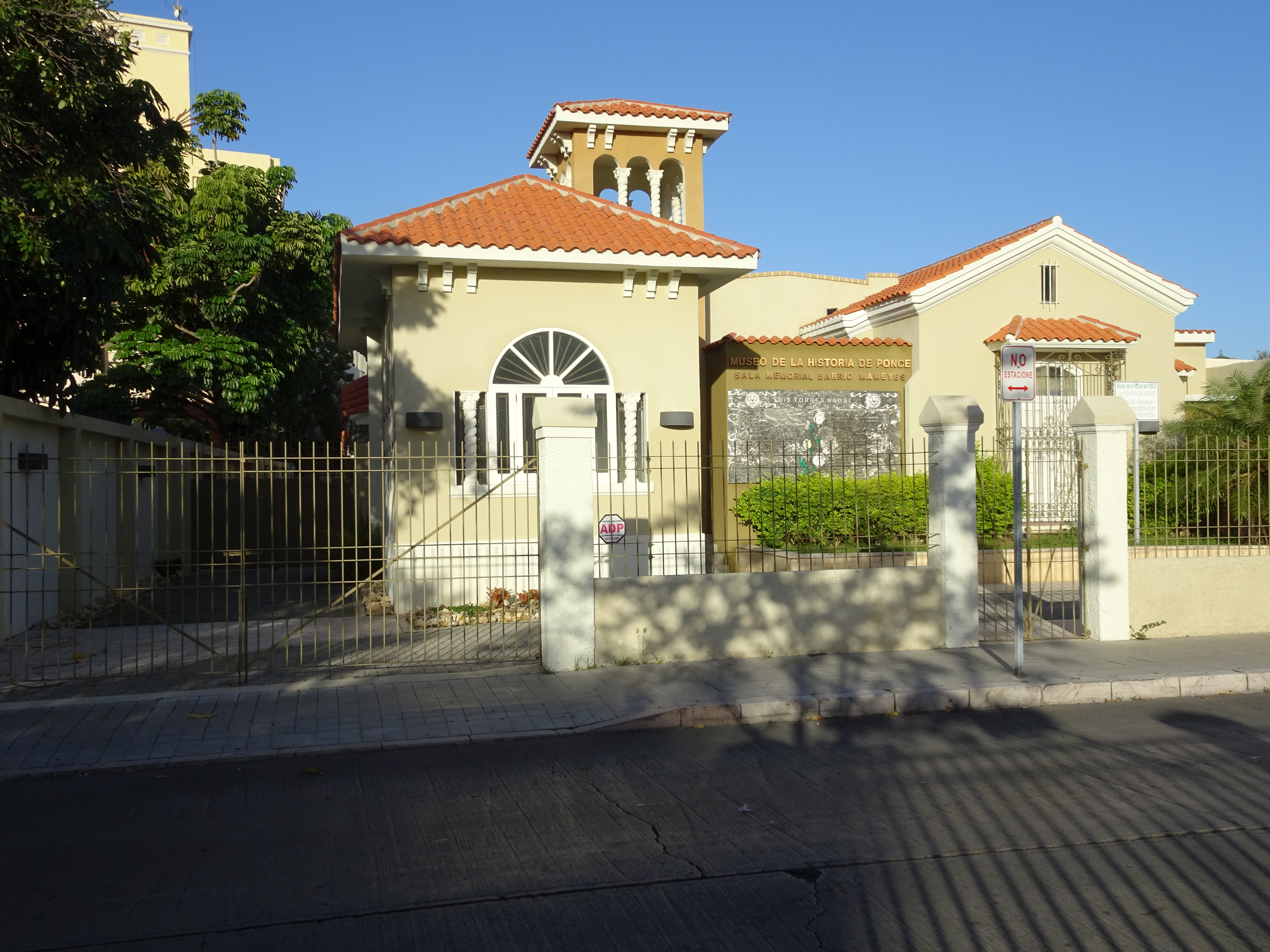
- Casa Rosita Serrallés (now Museo de la Recordacion del Barrio Mameyes)
- Interactive map of the Casa Rosita Serrallés area

General information
- Architectural style: Spanish Colonial Revival
- Location: Salud Street, between Isabel and Cristina Streets, Ponce, Puerto Rico
- Coordinates: 18.0120°N 66.6112°W
- Completed: 1926
- Renovated: 2012
- Cost: $364,807
- Client: Juan Eugenio Serralles

Design and construction
- Architect: Alfredo Wiechers Pieretti

Casa Rosita Serrallés (Spanish for Rosita Serrallés Residence) is a historic building in the city of Ponce, Puerto Rico, located between the former Escuela Libre de Música Juan Morel Campos and the Museo de la Historia de Ponce, and immediately behind Teatro La Perla, on Calle Salud street. It was built for one of the heirs of Juan Eugenio Serrallés Perez, son of businessman Juan Serrallés Colón, founder of Destilería Serrallés, and himself the CEO of the company that founded Ron Don Q. The building was purchased by the government of the Autonomous Municipality of Ponce in 2008 for its architectural, historic, and cultural value. As of February 2012, the building was being restored to convert it into an annex of the Museo de la Historia de Ponce to depict the 1985 Mameyes tragedy of barrio Portugues Urbano in Ponce. In 2014 it opened as "Museo de la Recordacion Barrio Mameyes" (Barrio Mameyes Memorial Museum) under Ponce mayor María Meléndez at Calle Salud 67. It is also known as "Sala Memorial del Barrio Mameyes" as it operates as a part of the Museo de la Historia de Ponce.

== History ==
In 1979 the house became the home of Rosita Serrallés Sánchez and her husband Guillermo Torruella Fornaris. Rosita and Guillermo had been living at the more spacious hilltop Castillo Serrallés mansion until Guillermo fell ill in 1979. Rosita Serrallés Sánchez was the daughter of Juan Eugenio Serrallés and Rosa María Sánchez, the couple that ordered the building of the spacious Castillo Serralles on the El Vigia Hill in Ponce. Upon Juan Eugenio and Rosa Maria's death, Rosita and Guillermo came to occupy the big hilltop mansion.

In 2008, the municipality of Ponce purchased the house from Rosa María ("Rosita") Torruella Serrallés, and her two brothers, Alberto J. Torruella Serrallés and Guillermo J. Torruella Serrallés. It was purchased for $364,807, under the administration of mayor Francisco Zayas Seijo. In 2014 it opened as "Museo de la Recordacion Barrio Mameyes" under Ponce mayor María Meléndez at Calle Salud 67. It is also known as "Sala Memorial del Barrio Mameyes" as it operates as a part of the Museo de la Historia de Ponce.

== Location ==
The house is located on the west side of Salud Street between Cristina and Isabel Streets, next to the Juan Morel Campos Music Institute, in the Ponce Historic Zone. The location of the house, together with its historic significance, courtyard, and architectural details, make it unique among other Puerto Rican homes. The structure is located on the same block as the historic Teatro La Perla and the Ponce History Museum. With the acquisition of this property by the city, the municipal government has termed the block within the Mayor, Cristina, Salud, and Isabel streets, the Plaza de la Cultura de Ponce (Plaza of Ponce Culture).

== Significance ==
Casa Rosita Serrallés was built as the exclusive residence of the heirs of Don Eugenio Serrallés, a leader in the sugar cane industry during the early part of the 20th century. The building is significant from the architectural, historical, and cultural perspectives.

Architecturally, the building represents an example of Spanish Colonial Revival architecture, a style first introduced in Puerto Rico by the architect Pedro Adolfo de Castro.

Historically, the building is a reminder of the cultural and economic changes that southern Puerto Rico experienced in the 1920s. "Ponce's dependence on the sugar cane industry at the close of the nineteenth century, created an atmosphere of development from which evolved a series of intrinsic cultural characteristics and afforded great wealth to many families involved in the industry. The wealthy families generally chose Europe as the model for the direction that cultural endeavors would take."

Culturally, the building is important because it was the downtown residence of one of the wealthiest families in 19th-century Puerto Rico, and one that so much influenced its economy. The original hill-top residence of the family was Castillo Serralles, today a historic structure listed in the NRHP. The Casa Rosita Serralles structure was acquired by the city of Ponce "to increase its cultural holdings." The Institute of Puerto Rican Culture is expected to aid in the restoration of the residence.

== Physical characteristics ==
The house is a single floor building. Access to the main entrance of the house is from the front Calle Salud street. The building has a short front facade but its east-to-west axis is articulated as a relatively long structure. It was built in 1926 by local architect Alfredo Wiechers Pieretti. It includes a large back courtyard.

The building was constructed entirely of concrete. The residence was designed in a style popular in the 1910s for representing Spanish Mediterranean influence. Prominent throughout the building is the use of red roof tiles. This accent is also present on all other rooftops. The exterior of the buildings is finished in stucco.

== Intended Use ==
As of February 2012, the building was being restored to convert it into an annex of the Museo de la Historia de Ponce which is to depict the 1985 Mameyes tragedy of barrio Portugues Urbano in Ponce.

== See also ==
- Juan Serrallés
- Destilería Serrallés
- Castillo Serrallés
