= Hacienda =

Spanish word used to refer to estates with large business enterprises

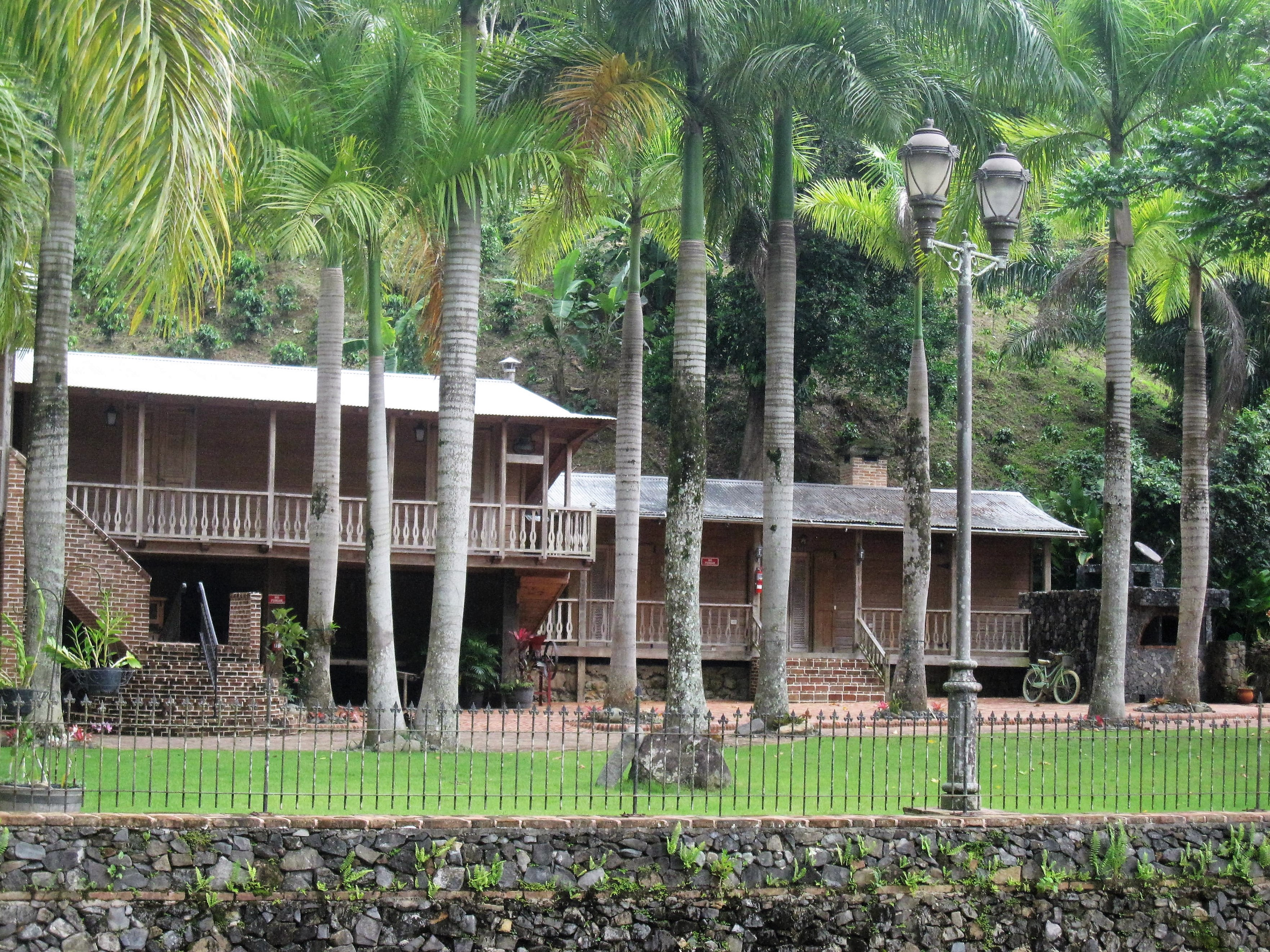
Hacienda Lealtad is a working coffee hacienda which used slave labor in the 19th century, located in Lares, Puerto Rico.

A hacienda (UK: /ˌhæsiˈɛndə/ HASS-ee-EN-də or US: /ˌhɑːsiˈɛndə/ HAH-see-EN-də; Spanish: [aˈθjenda] or [aˈsjenda]) is an estate (or finca), similar to a Roman latifundium, in Spain and the former Spanish Empire. With origins in Andalusia, haciendas were variously plantations (perhaps including animals or orchards), mines, or factories, with many haciendas combining these activities. The word is derived from Spanish hacer (to make, from Latin facere) and haciendo (making), referring to productive business enterprises.

The term hacienda is imprecise, but usually refers to landed estates of significant size, while smaller holdings were termed estancias or ranchos. All colonial haciendas were owned almost exclusively by Spaniards and criollos, or rarely by mixed-race individuals. In Argentina, the term estancia is used for large estates that in Mexico would be termed haciendas. In recent decades, the term has been used in the United States for an architectural style associated with the traditional estate manor houses.

The hacienda system of Argentina, Bolivia, Chile, Colombia, Guatemala, El Salvador, Mexico, New Granada, and Peru was an economic system of large land holdings. A similar system existed on a smaller scale in the Philippines and Puerto Rico. In Puerto Rico, haciendas were larger than estancias; ordinarily grew sugar cane, coffee, or cotton; and exported their crops abroad.

== Origins and growth ==
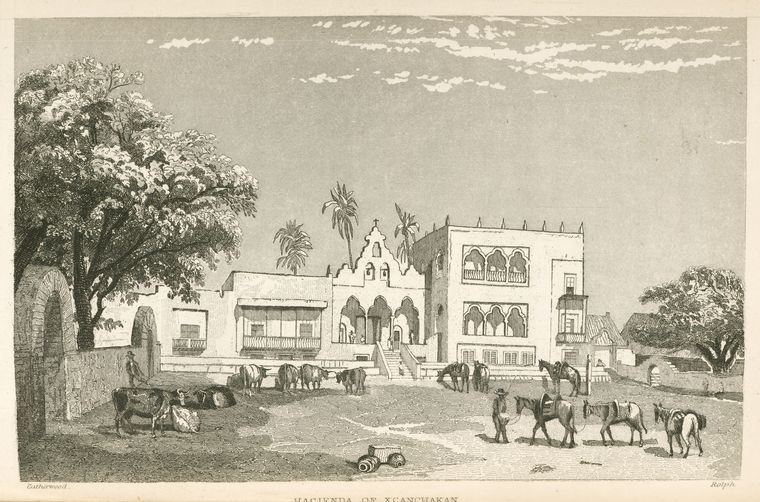
Hacienda of Xcanchakan, Yucatán, Mexico

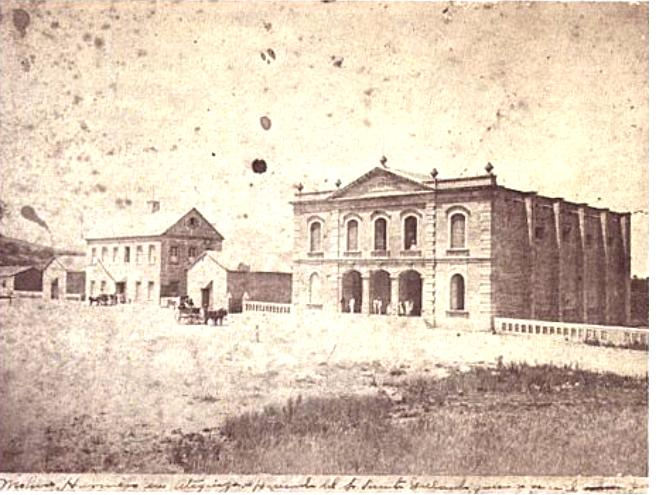
Wheat mill and theatre of Vicente Gallardo; Hacienda Atequiza, Jalisco, Mexico, 1886.

Haciendas originated during the Reconquista of Andalusia in Spain. The sudden acquisition of conquered land allowed kings to grant extensive holdings to nobles, mercenaries, and religious military orders to reward their military service. Andalusian haciendas produced wine, grain, oils, and livestock, and were more purely agricultural than what was to follow in Spanish America.

During the Spanish colonization of the Americas, the hacienda model was exported to the New World, continuing the pattern of the Reconquista. As the Spanish established cities in conquered territories, the crown distributed smaller plots of land nearby, while in areas farther afield, the conquistadores were allotted large land grants which became haciendas and estancias. Haciendas were developed as profit-making enterprises linked to regional or international markets. Estates were integrated into a market-based economy aimed at the Hispanic sector and cultivated crops such as sugar, wheat, fruits and vegetables and produced animal products such as meat, wool, leather, and tallow.

The system in Mexico is considered to have started when the Spanish crown granted to Hernán Cortés the title of Marquis of the Valley of Oaxaca in 1529, including the entire present state of Morelos, as well as vast encomienda labor grants. Although haciendas originated in grants to the elite, many ordinary Spaniards could also petition for land grants from the crown. New haciendas were formed in many places in the 17th and 18th centuries as most local economies moved from mining toward agriculture and husbandry.

Distribution of land happened in parallel with the allocation of indigenous people to servitude under the encomienda system. Although the hacienda was not directly linked to the encomienda, many Spanish holders of encomiendas lucratively combined the two by acquiring land or developing enterprises to employ that forced labor. As the crown moved to eliminate encomienda labor, Spaniards consolidated private landholdings and recruited labor on a permanent or casual basis. Eventually, the hacienda became secure private property, which survived the colonial period and into the 20th century.

== Personnel ==
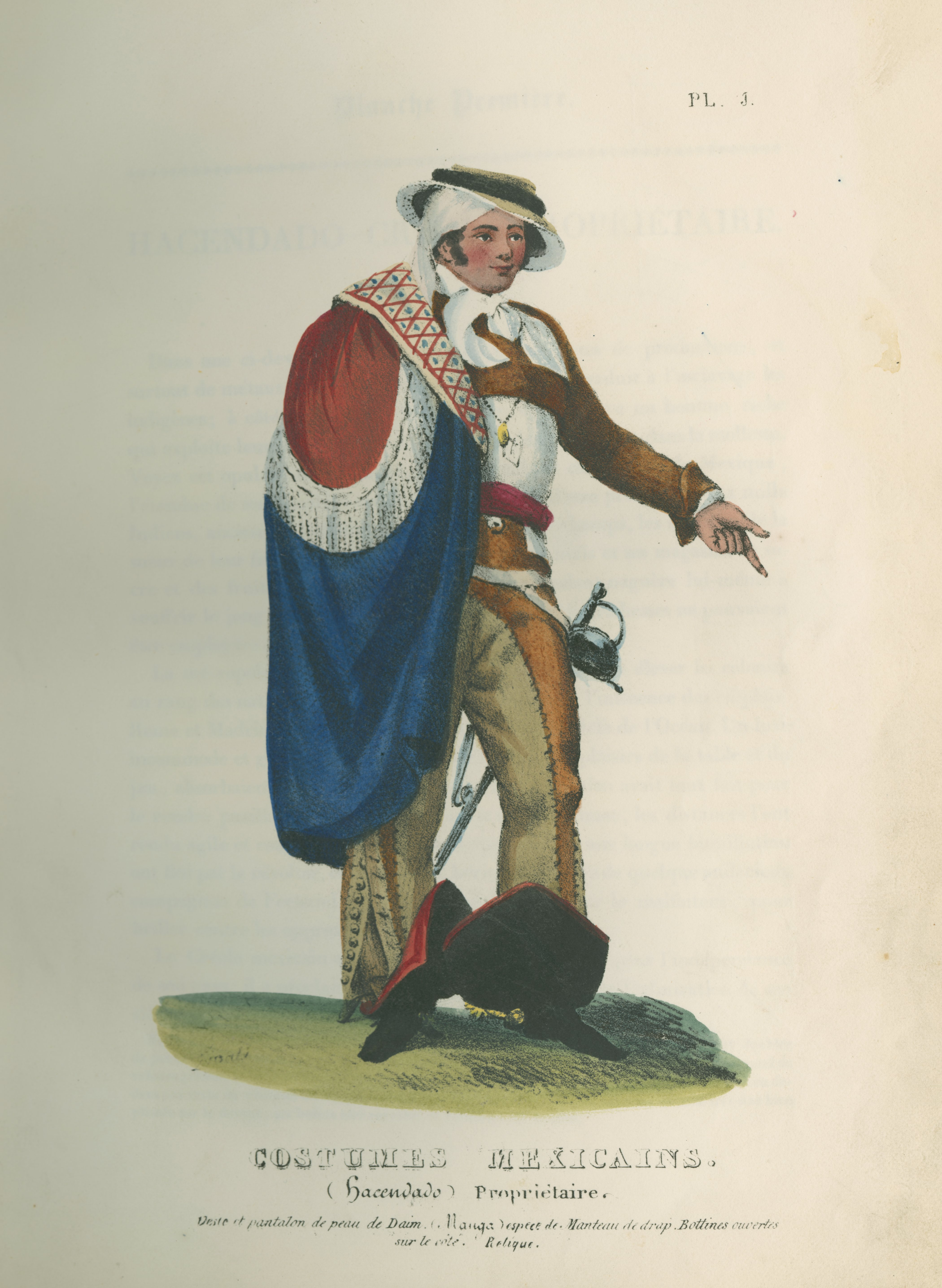
Hacendado. Claudio Linati, 1830.

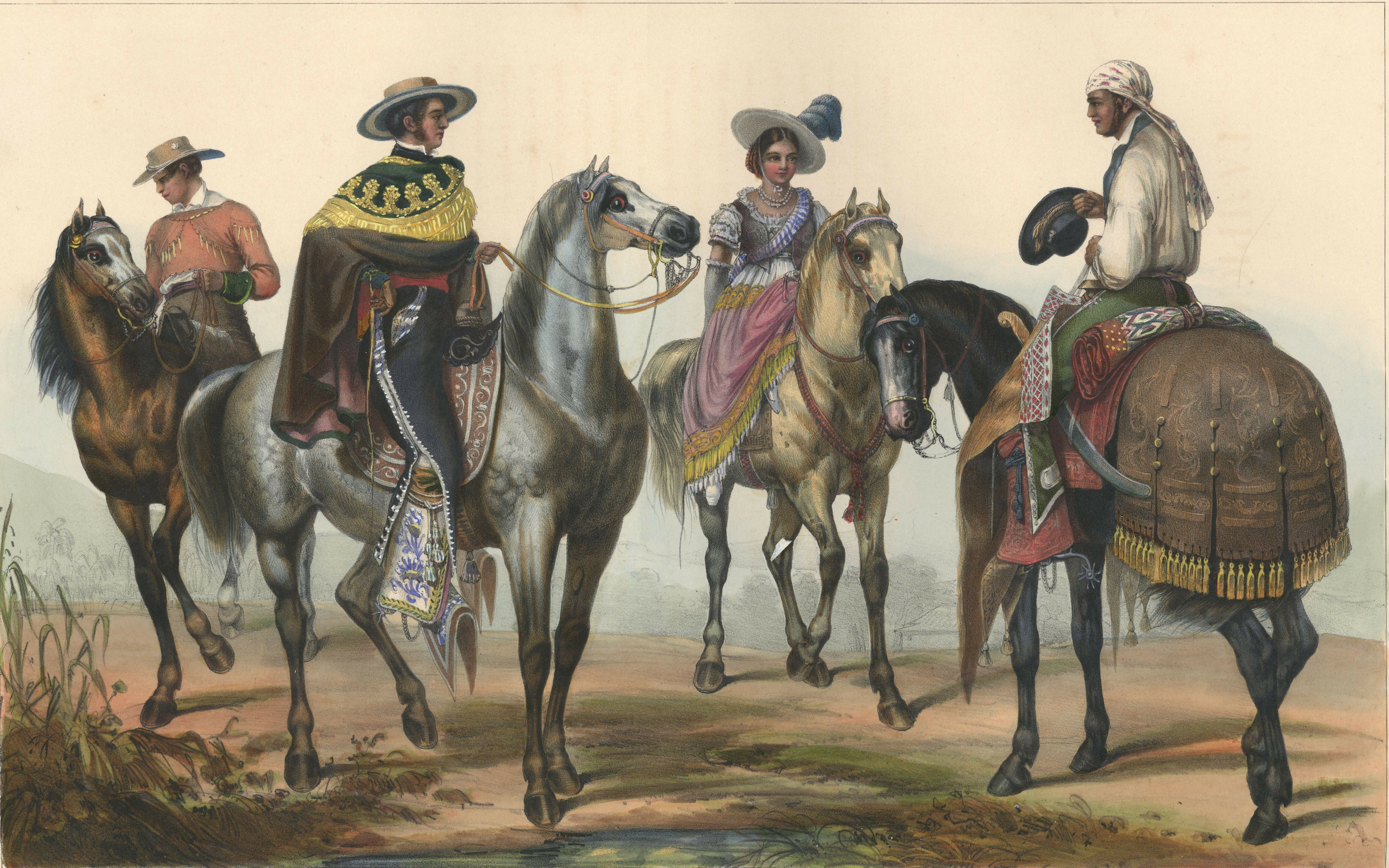
"El Hacendero y su Mayordomo" (The Hacendero and his Butler). Carl Nebel, 1836.

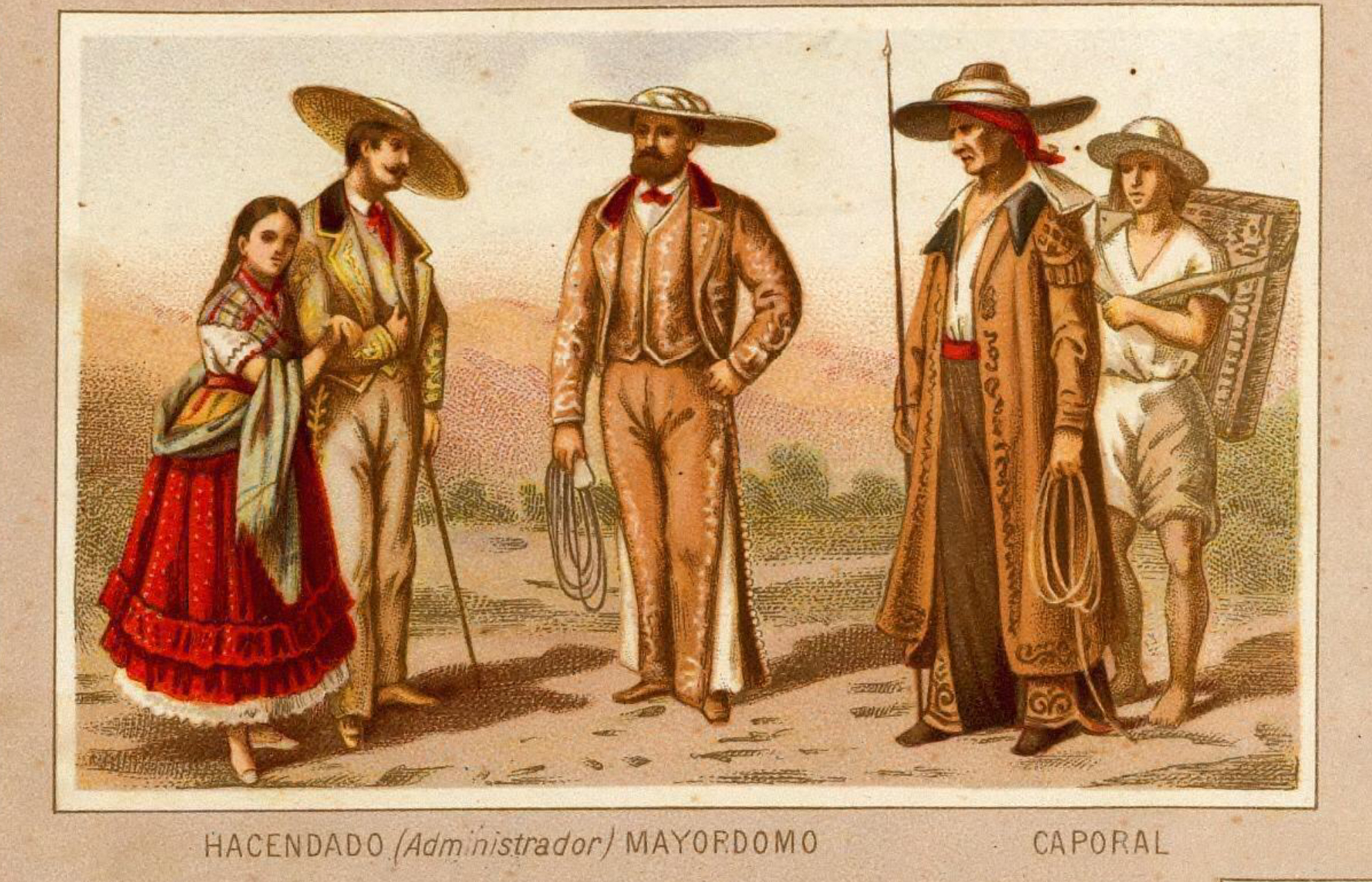
"Jerarquía de una Hacienda" (Hierarchy of a Mexican Hacienda). Antonio García Cubas

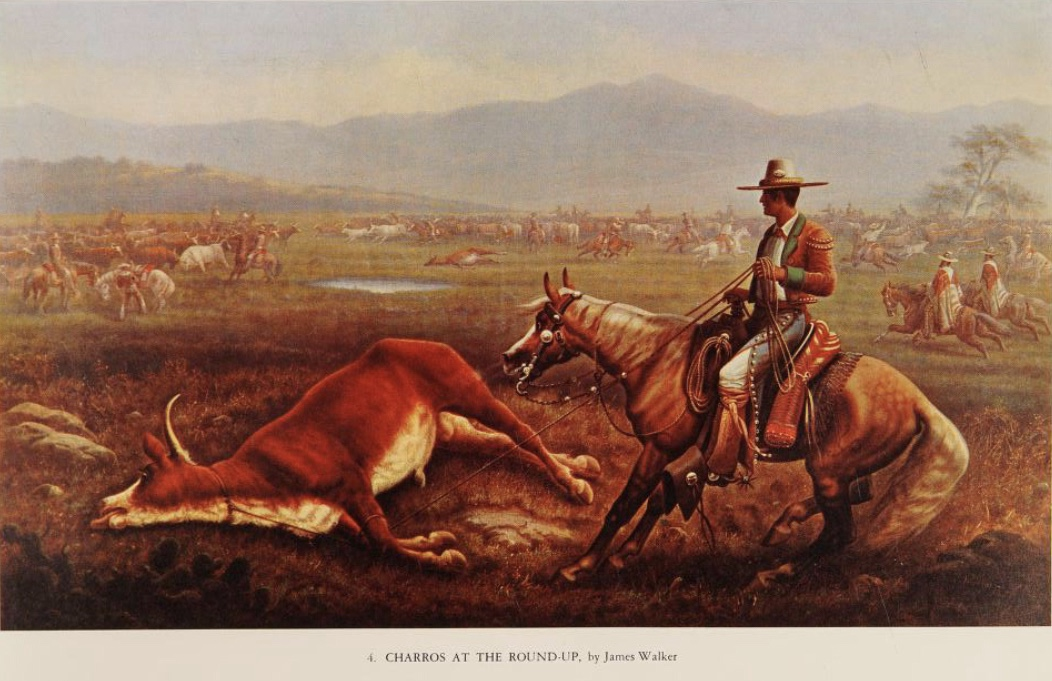
Mexican vaquero

In Spanish America, the owner of an hacienda was called the hacendado or patrón. Most owners of large and profitable haciendas preferred to live in Spanish cities, often near the hacienda, but in Mexico, the richest owners lived in Mexico City, visiting their haciendas at intervals. Onsite management of the rural estates was by a paid administrator or manager, which was similar to the arrangement with the encomienda. Administrators were often hired for a fixed term of employment, receiving a salary and at times some share of the profits of the estate. Some administrators also acquired landholdings themselves in the area of the estate they were managing.

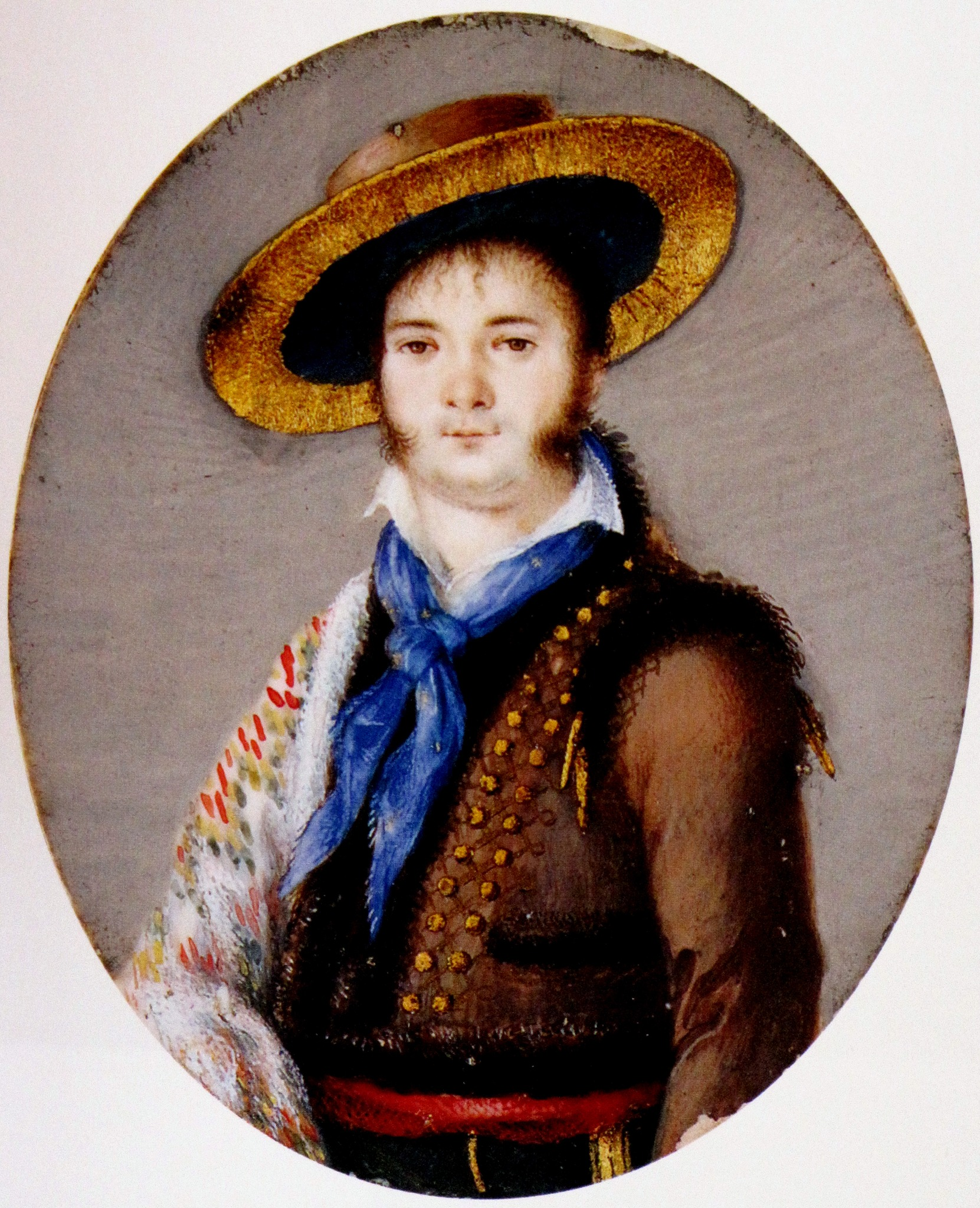
Juan Nepomuceno de Moncada y Berrio (1781–1859), owner of the Jaral de Berrios hacienda in Guanajuato. At one point, he was one of the largest land owners in the world.

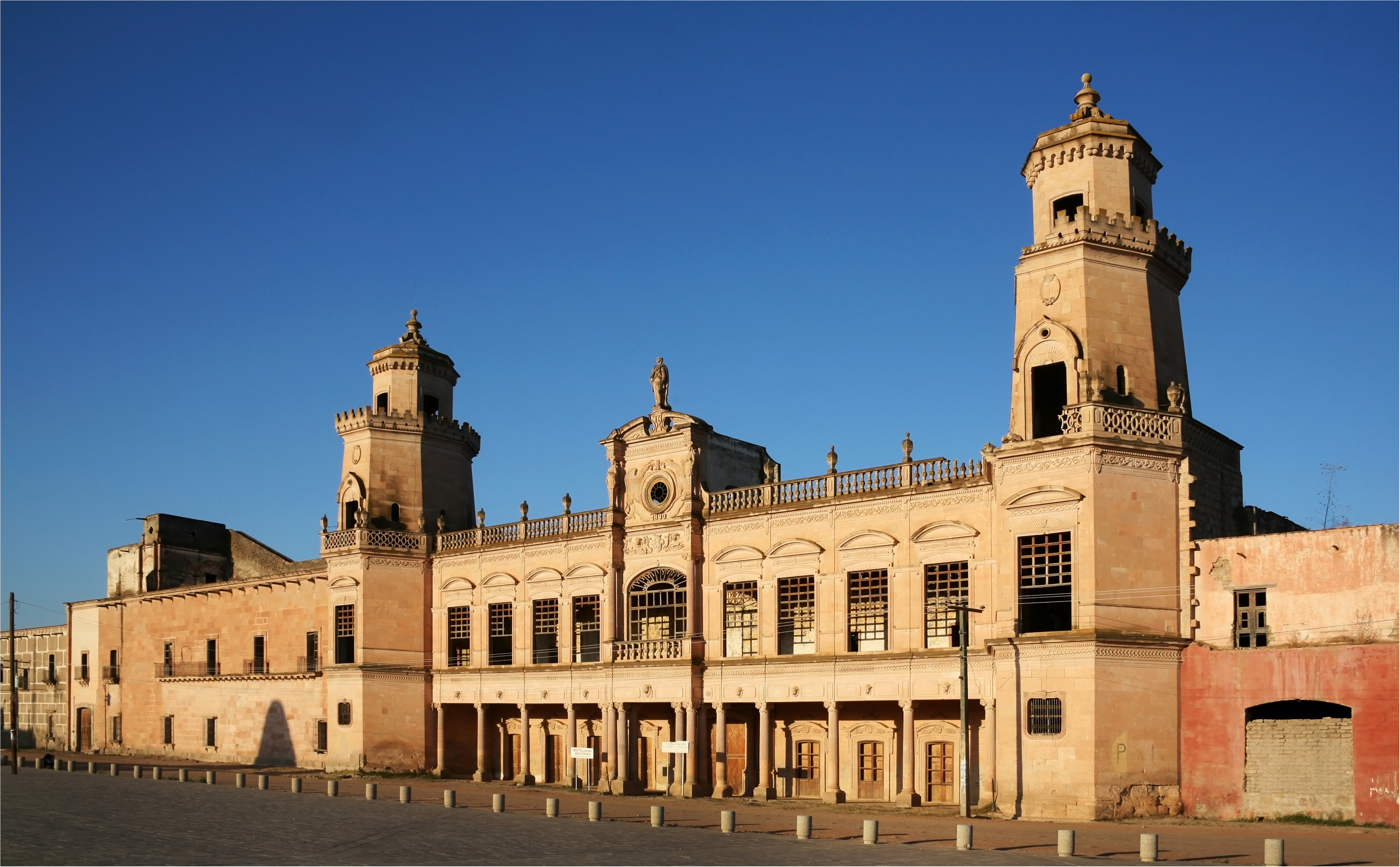
Jaral de Berrios, probably the most important Hacienda of colonial times. Its owner at one time was one of the largest landowners in the world. Located in the state of Guanajuato, Mexico

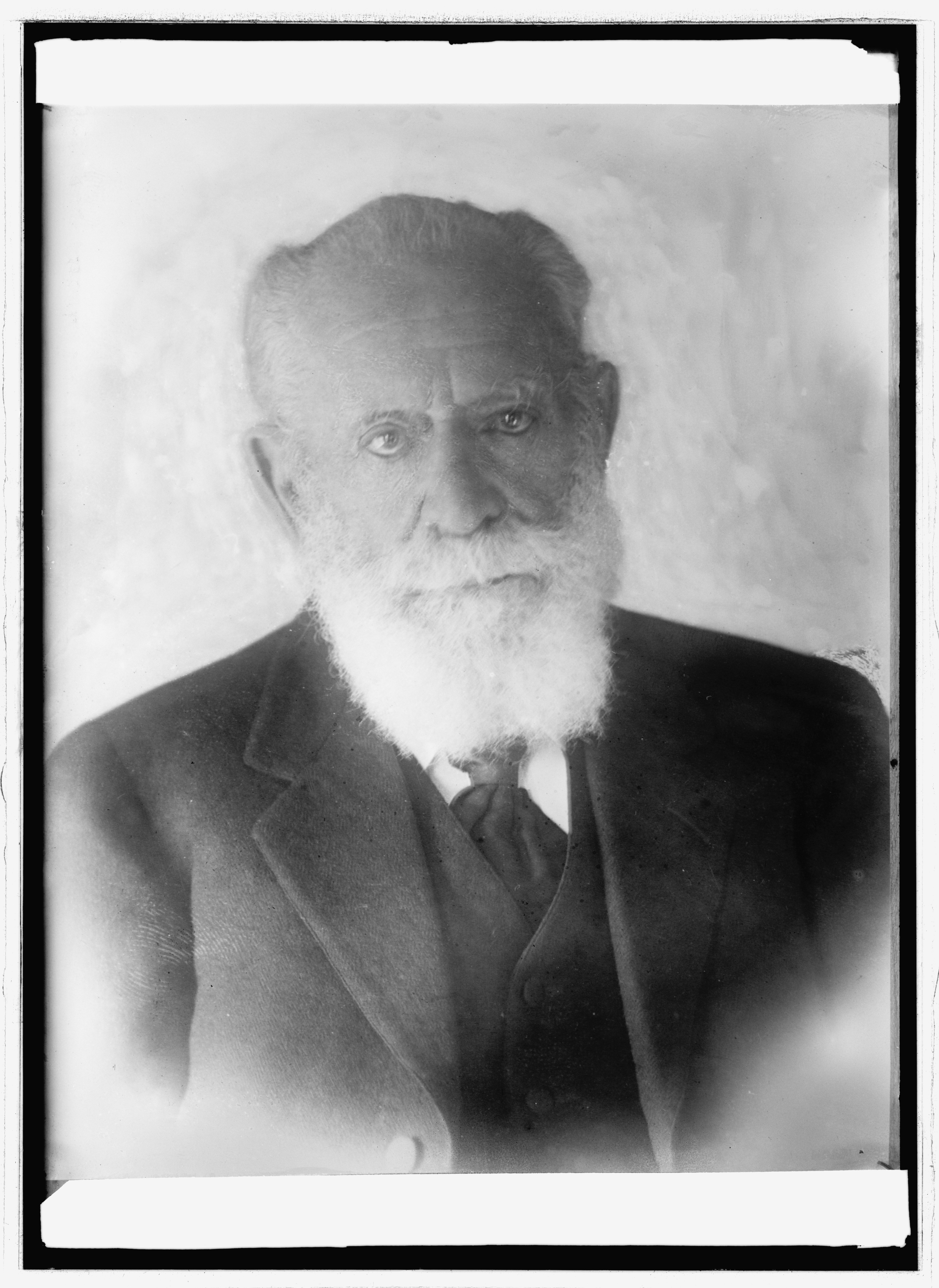
Don Luis Terrazas, hacendado from Chihuahua (state). By 1910, he owned around 8 million acres in land, and more than 1 million head of cattle.

The work force on haciendas varied, depending on the type of hacienda and where it was located. In central Mexico near indigenous communities and growing crops to supply urban markets, there was often a small, permanent workforce resident on the hacienda. Labor could be recruited from nearby indigenous communities on an as-needed basis, such as planting and harvest time. The permanent and temporary hacienda employees worked land that belonged to the patrón and under the supervision of local labor bosses. In some places small scale cultivators or campesinos worked small holdings belonging to the hacendado, and owed a portion of their crops to him.

Stock raising was central to ranching haciendas, the largest of which were in areas without dense indigenous populations, such as northern Mexico, but as indigenous populations declined in central areas, more land became available for grazing. Livestock were animals originally imported from Spain, including cattle, horses, sheep, and goats were part of the Columbian Exchange and produced significant ecological changes. Sheep in particular had a devastating impact on the environment due to overgrazing. Mounted ranch hands variously called vaqueros and gauchos (in the Southern Cone), among other terms worked for pastoral haciendas.

Where the hacienda included working mines, as in Mexico, the patrón might gain immense wealth. The unusually large and profitable Jesuit hacienda Santa Lucía, near Mexico City, established in 1576 and lasting to the expulsion in 1767, has been reconstructed by Herman Konrad from archival sources. This reconstruction has revealed the nature and operation of the hacienda system in Mexico, its labor force, its systems of land tenure and its relationship to larger Hispanic society in Mexico.

The Catholic Church and orders, especially the Jesuits, acquired vast hacienda holdings or preferentially loaned money to the hacendados. As the hacienda owners' mortgage holders, the Church's interests were connected with the landholding class. In the history of Mexico and other Latin American countries, the masses developed some hostility to the church; at times of gaining independence or during certain political movements, the people confiscated the church haciendas or restricted them.

Haciendas in the Caribbean were developed primarily as sugar plantations were dependent on the labor of African slaves imported to the region and staffed by slaves brought from Africa. In Puerto Rico, this system ended with the abolition of slavery on 22 March 1873.

== South American haciendas ==
In South America, the hacienda remained after the collapse of the colonial system in the early 19th century when nations gained independence. In some places, such as Dominican Republic, with independence came efforts to break up the large plantation holdings into a myriad of small subsistence farmers' holdings, an agrarian revolution.

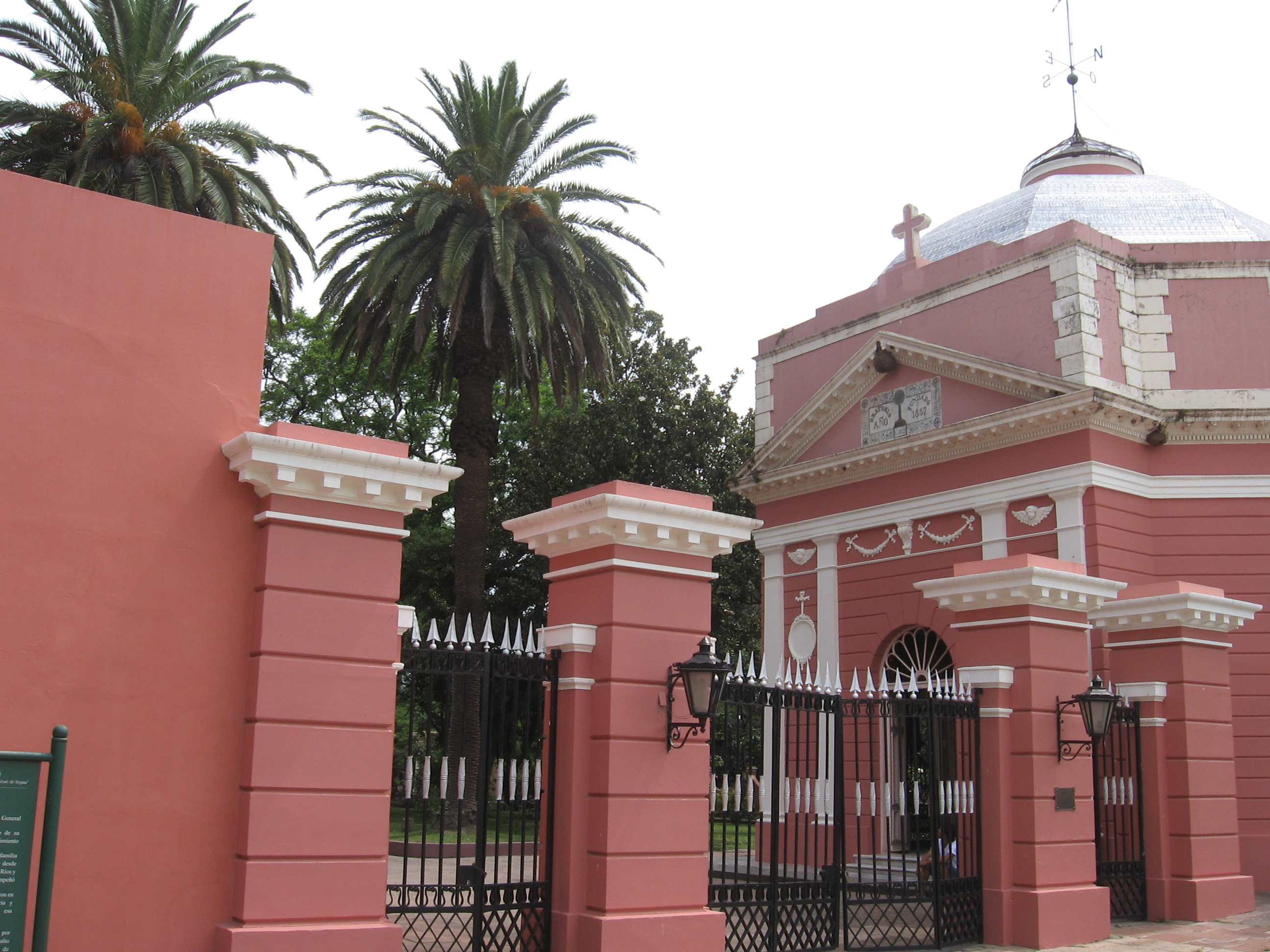
Palacio San José, Argentina; owned by Justo José de Urquiza, 19th century.

In Bolivia, haciendas were prevalent until the 1952 Revolution of Víctor Paz Estenssoro. He established an extensive program of land distribution as part of the Agrarian Reform. Likewise, Peru had haciendas until the Agrarian Reform (1969) of Juan Velasco Alvarado, who expropriated the land from the hacendados and redistributed it to the peasants.

=== Chile ===
The first haciendas of Chile formed during the Spanish conquest in the 16th century. The Destruction of the Seven Cities following the battle of Curalaba (1598) meant for the Spanish the loss of both the main gold districts and the largest sources of indigenous labour. After those dramatic years the colony of Chile became concentrated in Central Chile which became increasingly populated, explored and economically exploited. Much land in Central Chile was cleared with fire during this period. On the contrary open fields in southern Chile were overgrown as indigenous populations declined due to diseases introduced by the Spanish and intermittent warfare. The loss of the cities meant Spanish settlements in Chile became increasingly rural with the hacienda gaining importance in economic and social matters. As Chilean mining activity declined in the 17th century more haciendas were formed as the economy moved away from mining and into agriculture and husbandry.

Beginning in the late 17th century Chilean haciendas begun to export wheat to Peru. While the immediate cause of this was Peru being struck by both an earthquake and a stem rust epidemic, Chilean soil and climatic conditions were better for cereal production than those of Peru and Chilean wheat was cheaper and of better quality than Peruvian wheat. Initially Chilean haciendas could not meet the wheat demand due to a labour shortage, so had to incorporate temporary workers in addition to the permanent staff. Another response by the latifundia to labour shortages was to act as merchants, buying wheat produced by independent farmers or from farmers that hired land. In the period 1700 to 1850, this second option was overall more lucrative. It was primarily the haciendas of Central Chile, La Serena and Concepción that came to be involved in cereal export to Peru.

In the 19th and early 20th century haciendas were the main prey for Chilean banditry. 20th century Chilean haciendas stand out for the poor conditions of workers and being a backward part of the economy. The hacienda and inquilinaje institutions that characterized large parts of Chilean agriculture were eliminated by the Chilean land reform (1962–1973).

== Other locations ==
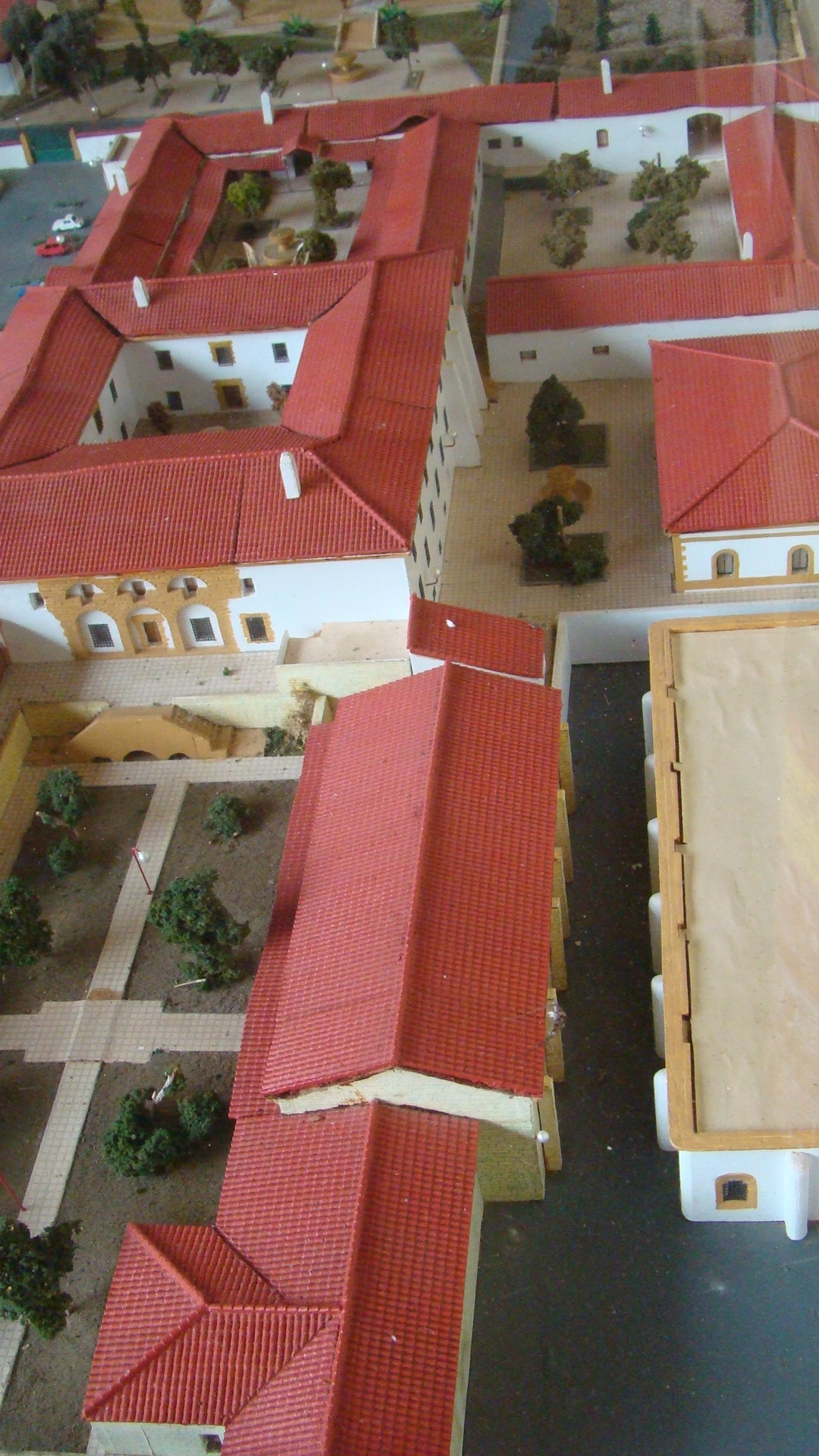
Model of the Hacienda de la Laguna.

=== Philippines ===
In the Philippines, the hacienda system and lifestyles were influenced by the Spanish colonisation that occurred via Mexico for more than 300 years, but which only took off in the 1850s at the behest of Nicholas Loney, an English businessman and the British Empire's vice-consul in the city of Iloílo. Loney's objective, according to Alfred W. McCoy, was the systematic deindustrialisation of Iloílo. This deindustrialisation was to be accomplished through shifting labour and capital from Iloílo's textile industry (Hiligaynon: habol Ilonggo), the origins of which predate the arrival of the Castilians, to sugar-production on the neighbouring island of Negros. The Port of Iloílo was also opened to the flood of cheaply priced British textiles. These changes had the double effect of strengthening England and Scotland's textile industries at the expense of Iloílo's and satisfying the growing European demand for sugar.

In the late 20th and early 21st centuries, attempts to abolish the hacienda system in the country through land-reform laws have not been successful. The expiration of the Laurel–Langley Agreement and the resultant collapse of the Negros sugar industry gave President Ferdinand E. E. Marcos the opening to strip the hacenderos of their self-appointed roles as kingmakers in national politics. Hopes were short-lived, however, as protests revolving around Hacienda Luisita, as well as massacres and targeted assassinations in the Negros provinces, continue to this day. The opportunity that had earlier arisen was squandered and any significant gains stillborn.

=== Puerto Rico ===
Haciendas in Puerto Rico developed during the time of Spanish colonization. An example of these was the 1833 Hacienda Buena Vista, which dealt primarily with the cultivation, packaging, and exportation of coffee. Today, Hacienda Buena Vista, which is listed in the United States National Register of Historic Places, is operated as a museum, Museo Hacienda Buena Vista.

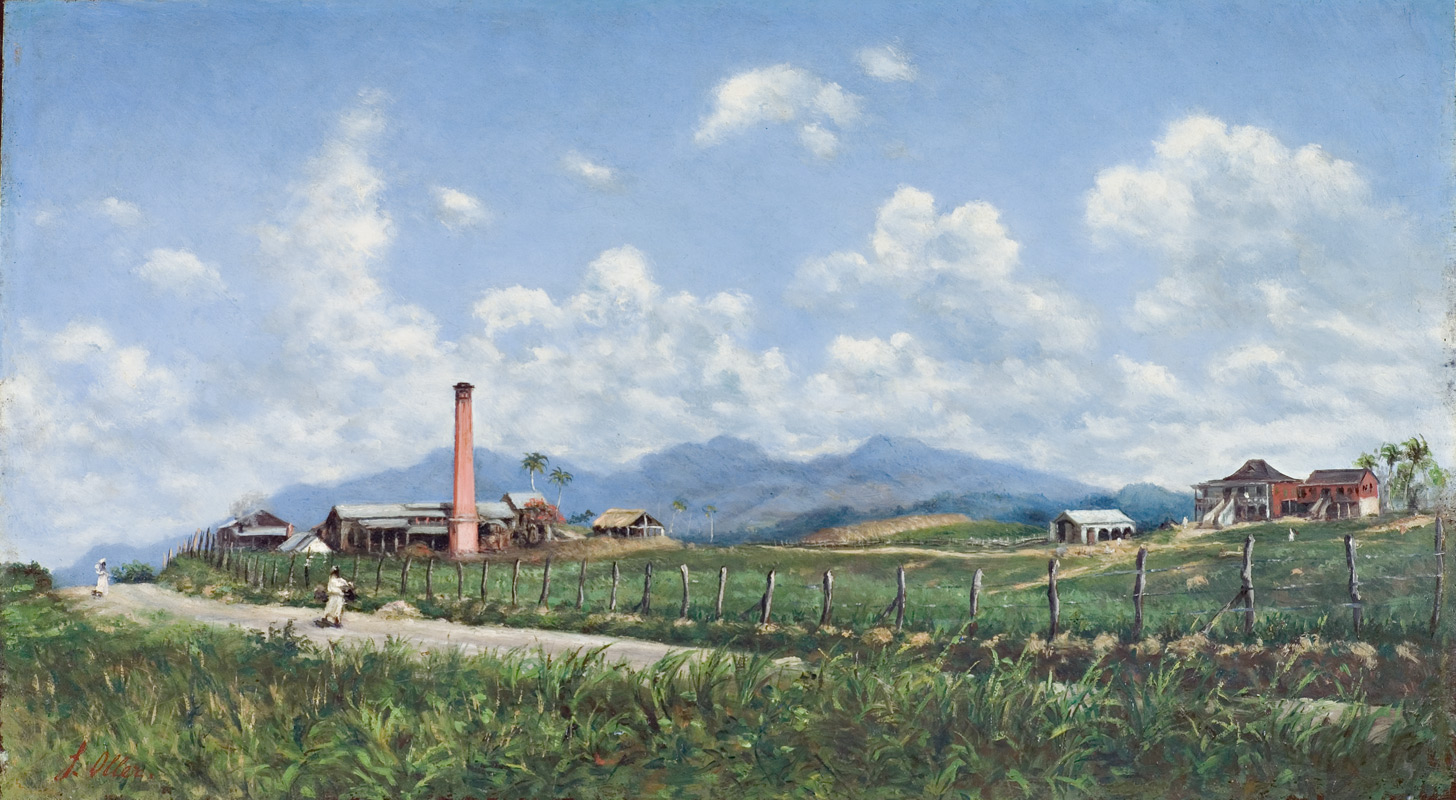
Francisco Oller's depiction of Hacienda Aurora (1899) in Ponce, Puerto Rico

The 1861 Hacienda Mercedita was a sugar plantation that once produced, packaged and sold sugar in the Snow White brand name. In the late 19th century, Mercedita became the site of production of Don Q rum. Its profitable rum business is today called Destilería Serrallés. The last of such haciendas decayed considerably starting in the 1950s, with the industrialization of Puerto Rico via Operation Bootstrap. At the turn of the 20th century, most coffee haciendas had disappeared.

The sugar-based haciendas changed into centrales azucarelas. Yet by the 1990s, and despite significant government fiscal support, the last 13 Puerto Rican centrales azucares were forced to shut down. This marked the end of haciendas operating in Puerto Rico. In 2000, the last two sugar mills closed, after having operated for nearly 100 years.

An "estancia" was a similar type of food farm. An estancia differed from an hacienda in terms of crop types handled, target market, machinery used, and size. An estancia, during Spanish colonial times in Puerto Rico (1508 – 1898), (Note: After the change of sovereignty in 1898 from Spain to the United States as a result of the Spanish-American War, and the ensuing industrialization and development of a manufacturing- and services-based society of the mid 20th century, both haciendas and estancias gradually diminished to almost non-existent.) was a plot of land used for cultivating "frutos menores" (minor crops). That is, the crops in such estancia farms were produced in relatively small quantities and thus were meant, not for wholesale or exporting, but for sale and consumption locally, where produced and its adjacent towns. Haciendas, unlike estancias, were equipped with industrial machinery used for processing its crops into derivatives such as juices, marmalades, flours, etc., for wholesale and exporting. Some "frutos menores" grown in estancias were rice, corn, beans, batatas, ñames, yautías, and pumpkins; among fruits were plantains, bananas, oranges, avocados, and grapefruits. Most haciendas in Puerto Rico produced sugar, coffee, and tobacco, which were the crops for exporting. Some estancias were larger than some haciendas, but generally this was the exception and not the norm.

== Other meanings ==
In the present era, the Ministerio de Hacienda is the government department in Spain that deals with finance and taxation, as in Mexico Secretaría de Hacienda y Crédito Público, and which is equivalent to the Department of the Treasury in the United States or HM Treasury in the United Kingdom.

== Notable haciendas ==
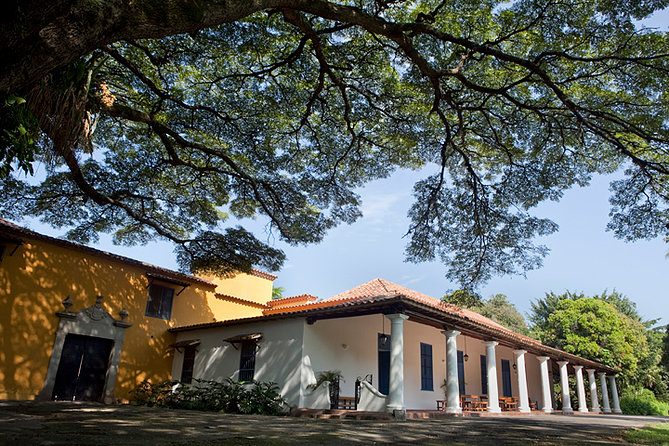
Main house of the Hacienda La Vega, in Caracas, Venezuela

- Hacienda Cocoyoc (Mexico)
- Hacienda Demiñho (Mexico)
- Hacienda Buena Vista (Puerto Rico)
- Hacienda Juriquilla (Mexico)
- Hacienda Luisita (Philippines)
- Hacienda Mercedita (Puerto Rico)
- Hacienda San Antonio de Petrel (Chile)
- Hacienda Moraga (Venezuela)
- Hacienda San Jose Chactún (Mexico)
- Hacienda Yorba (US)
- Palacio San José (Argentina)
- Sánchez Navarro latifundio (Mexico)
- Hacienda La Trinidad (Venezuela)
- Hacienda La Vega (Venezuela)
- Hacienda San Mateo (Venezuela)
- Hacienda Santa Teresa (Venezuela)
- Hacienda El Cedral (Venezuela)

== See also ==
- Cortijo
- Fazenda
- Feudalism
- Mit'a, a form of tribute to the Inca government in the form of labor, abused by the Spanish Viceroyalty of Peru
- "My Adobe Hacienda"
- Repartimiento, a colonial forced labor system imposed upon the indigenous population of Spanish America and the Philippines
- Roman villa
