= List of Puerto Rican rums =

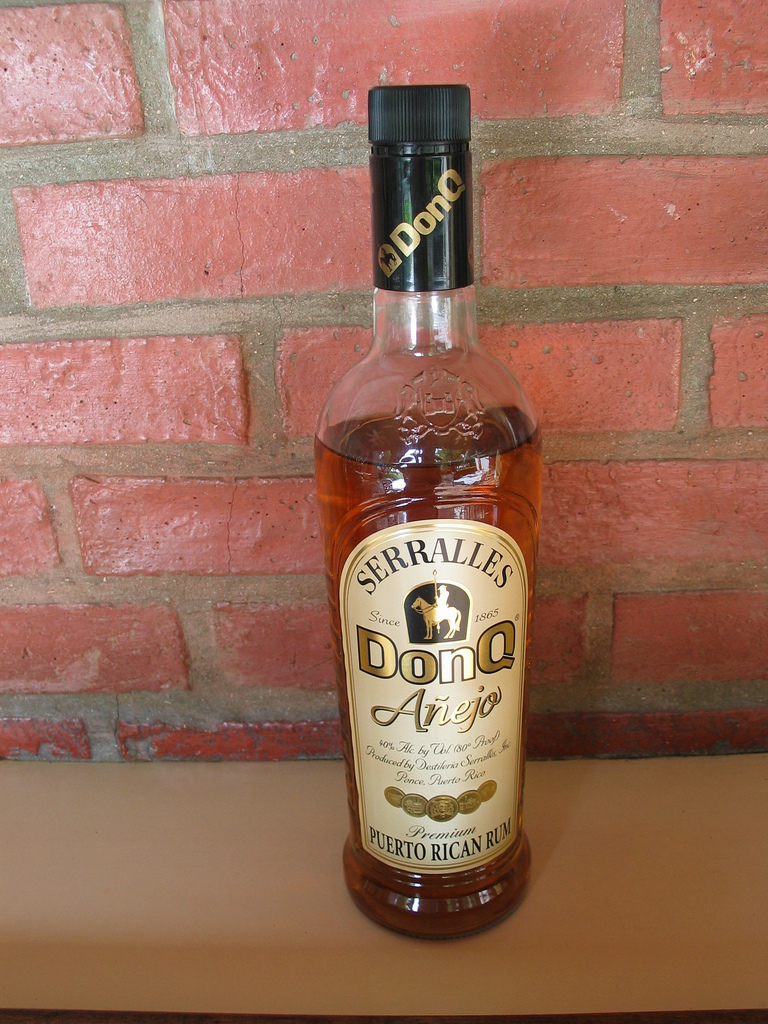
Don Q Añejo, a barrel-aged rum

Rum (ron in Spanish) production has been an important part of Puerto Rico's economy since the 16th century. While sugar cane harvesting has virtually disappeared in Puerto Rico (except for a few isolated farms and agricultural experiments), distilleries around the island still produce large amounts of rum every year. Don Q is the top-selling rum brand on the island, where more than 70% of the rum consumed in the United States is produced.

== Rum production by city ==
=== Arecibo ===
The main rum producing enterprise in Arecibo is Barceló, Marqués Y Co. Its flagship brand was Ron Palo Viejo. Ron Palo Viejo is now owned by Serrallés, whose flagship rum is Don Q.

Rum has been produced in Arecibo since the second half of the 19th century. Roses, García y Co. was bottling their Ron de la Casa de Roses as early as 1868. Ron Llave dates from 1891, and by 1893 they were purveyors of rum under license from the Royal house of Spain.

There were several rum producers in Arecibo by the beginning of the 20th century. Most of them merged their distillery operations into a single entity, the Puerto Rico Distilling Co., which was formally incorporated on February 2, 1911. The new company eventually became the principal supplier of partially refined or final product to rum aging, blending and bottling companies in Mayagüez and Bayamón. During Prohibition the company turned into producing denatured alcohol, bay rum (up to 265 different brands of bay rum were eventually produced at the main distilling plant, including the best-selling Alcoholado Superior 70 and Alcoholado Santa Claus) and other industrial products. Rum production returned in 1934, with Ron Candado. In 1935, a joint venture with Florida Cane Products, Inc., spawned a new corporation, Ron Rico, whose flagship product was the Ronrico rum and which had considerable success selling rum in the United States. A new distilling plant was opened in 1942.

The following are rums produced in Arecibo (or in nearby Barceloneta while the holding company was Arecibo-based):

- Ron Pizá
- Ron Llave
- Ron Candado
- Ron Tres Estrellas
- Ron San Isidro
- Ron Cañón
- Ron Portela
- Ron Granado
- Ron Palo Viejo (Produced in Camuy, near Arecibo)

=== Bayamón ===
- Ron del Barrilito - Edmundo B. Fernandez Inc.

The company producing it was founded by Edmundo Fernandez in the early 19th century. It has produced its rum inside a brick and mortar windmill tower located originally within a sugar cane plantation, the Hacienda Santa Ana, now an industrial park in the outskirts of Bayamón. Its yearly production run is a limited one. The company is known for a rum liqueur which is made with honey. The company was sold and recapitalized by a partnership led by a member of the Bacardi family including other local investors. It has diversified its product to include premium aged rums.

=== Cataño ===
- Bacardi is produced in Cataño near San Juan. It is owned by the Bacardi family who are originally from Cuba.

=== Cidra ===
In 2014 it was announced that CC1 Industries Inc. would be constructing a new rum distillery Club Caribe Distillers in Cidra, Puerto Rico. This was the location of a pharmaceutical plant owned by GlaxoSmithKline which had closed. The new distillery however included a hospitality center and function hall contributing to local tourism. CC1 Industries Inc. is affiliated with Florida Caribbean Distillers which is based in Florida. The distillery was completed and ran its first distillation run in September 2018.

=== Jayuya ===
- PitoRico - Destilería Cruz Ron Artesanal Puertorriqueño

=== Mayagüez ===
The city of Mayagüez had various rum producing companies, some of which were contractors for United States and Bahamian-based public and private brands.

Destileria Coqui Inc established a new rum distillery in Mayagüez in 2009, named Destilería Coquí;. The Destilería's main product is an artisan rum called Pitorro, analogous to the name in common use to describe Puerto Rican moonshine rum.

=== Ponce ===
- Don Q (Serrallés) - Puerto Rico's top-selling rum
- Blackbeard Spiced Rum (Serrallés)
- Boca Chica Rum - Boca Chica Distilling Company
- Caliche Rum (Serrallés)

The main rum-producing enterprise in Ponce is Destilería Serrallés, Inc., which has been producing rum in site since 1865. Its flagship brand, Ron Don Q (short for Don Quijote, the favorite character of one of the Serrallés family heirs) dates from 1932. Don Q is Puerto Rico's top-selling rum.

=== San Juan ===
- Scryer Rum - small-batch pot-distilled, premium rum aged in Old San Juan, PR

== Miscellaneous rum production notes ==
- Club Caribe - (Company: Club Caribe LLC, Cidra, Puerto Rico) created to offset the losses from Captain Morgan moving to the Virgin Islands
- Don Q - the topselling rum brand in Puerto Rico
- Bacardi is produced in Cataño - was originally developed by Spanish immigrants to Cuba.
- Ron Castillo - produced by Ron de Castillo y Cia (San Juan, Puerto Rico), a subsidiary of Bacardi.
- Trigo Reserva Añeja - produced by Trigo Corp, San Juan, Puerto Rico, who purchases its rum base from Bacardi. The Trigo Corp specializes in aging and blending local rums according to their own unique methods. In addition to Reserva Aneja, they produce the popular Ron Canita de Alambique, Trigo Coquito, Twin Isle and Ron Bugalu coconut rum.

== Other ==
- Marin
- Ron Pascual
- Three Captains
