= Palo Viejo =

Puerto Rican rum brand

Palo Viejo (or, alternatively, Ron Palo Viejo) is a Puerto Rican rum brand.

== History ==
Not much has been publicized about the drink's history; however, it is known that it was at first owned by an Arecibo located company named Barcelo Marques y Co., until they sold it to the Serralles Distillery company from Ponce. During the 1980s, Palo Viejo advertised heavily on Puerto Rican television, including a commercial that featured a young Osvaldo Rios as a background painter. Palo Viejo television ads were also prominent during Baloncesto Superior Nacional basketball game transmissions on the island.

On October 21, 2015, the Palo Viejo brand released "Palo Ready", a pouch, ready-to-drink beverage made of different fruits and of Palo Viejo rum, which is available at different supermarkets in Puerto Rico.

== Ownership ==
The Palo Viejo brand is owned by the Destileria Serralles company of Puerto Rico, owners also of the Don Q rum brand.
