= Hacienda Mercedita =

Former 300-acre (120 ha) sugarcane plantation in Ponce, Puerto Rico

Coordinates: 18.01826°N 66.56378°W

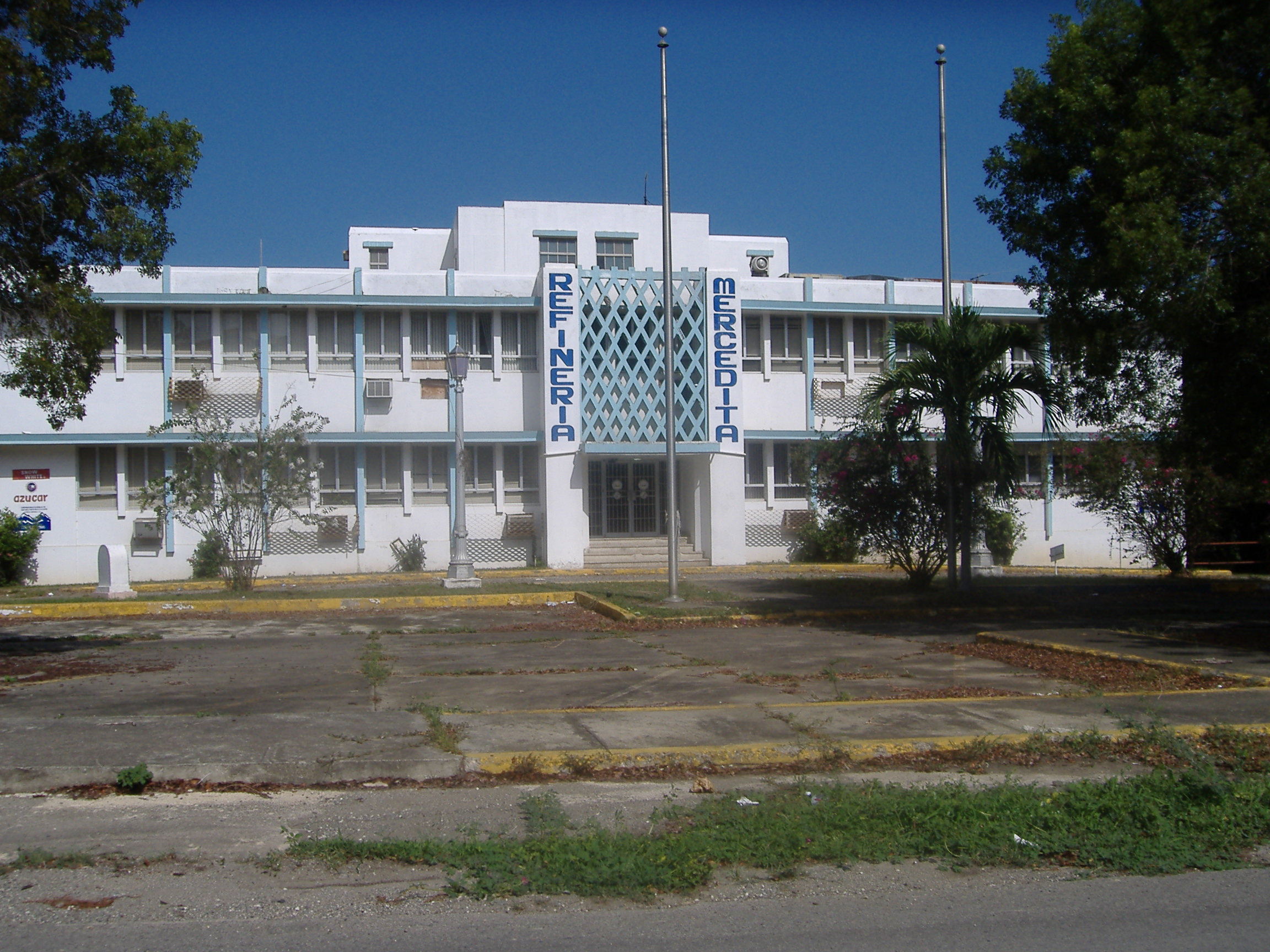
Abandoned Central Mercedita sugar refinery office building. Note the Snow White Sugar sign and decal on the left of the building facade.

Hacienda Mercedita was a 300-acre (120 ha) sugarcane plantation in Ponce, Puerto Rico, founded in 1861, by Juan Serrallés Colón. Today Hacienda Mercedita no longer grows sugarcane and its lands are instead used for growing mangoes, grasses, landscape plants and palms, coconut palms, bananas, and seeds.

The Hacienda was the administrative center of the large sugarcane mill called Central Mercedita as well as that of its cane sugar refinery plant which packaged the Snow White brand sugar at its nearby packaging plant. Hacienda Mercedita was also the site of origin of a rum production in 1865 that became the successful Destilería Serrallés rum distillery producing Don Q and other spirits. After operating continuously since 1949, (Note: Central Mercedita existed since at least 1921, but before 1949 it operated as part of the Sucesión J. Serralles company which included the other sugar and run-related enterprises. In 1949, however, Central Mercedita become its own corporation, being incorporated on that year as "Central Mercedita, Inc." See Mariano Vidal Armstrong's Ponce, Notas para su Historia. (Second edition. 1986. p. 72.)) Central Mercedita closed down in December 1994, and its sugar mill site is abandoned and in ruins. The Serrallés rum distillery, however, is an expanding and successful company still operating from the same original location, in barrio Vayas, southeast of the intersection of routes PR-10 and PR-52. Central Mercedita, where the local sugar cane was processed, is now owned by Puerto Rico's Autoridad de Tierras (English: Land Authority). Though Hacienda Mercedita was located in a different barrio, Sabanetas, its location was next to the rum distillery, the two being separated only by La Esperanza street (PR-5506).

== History ==
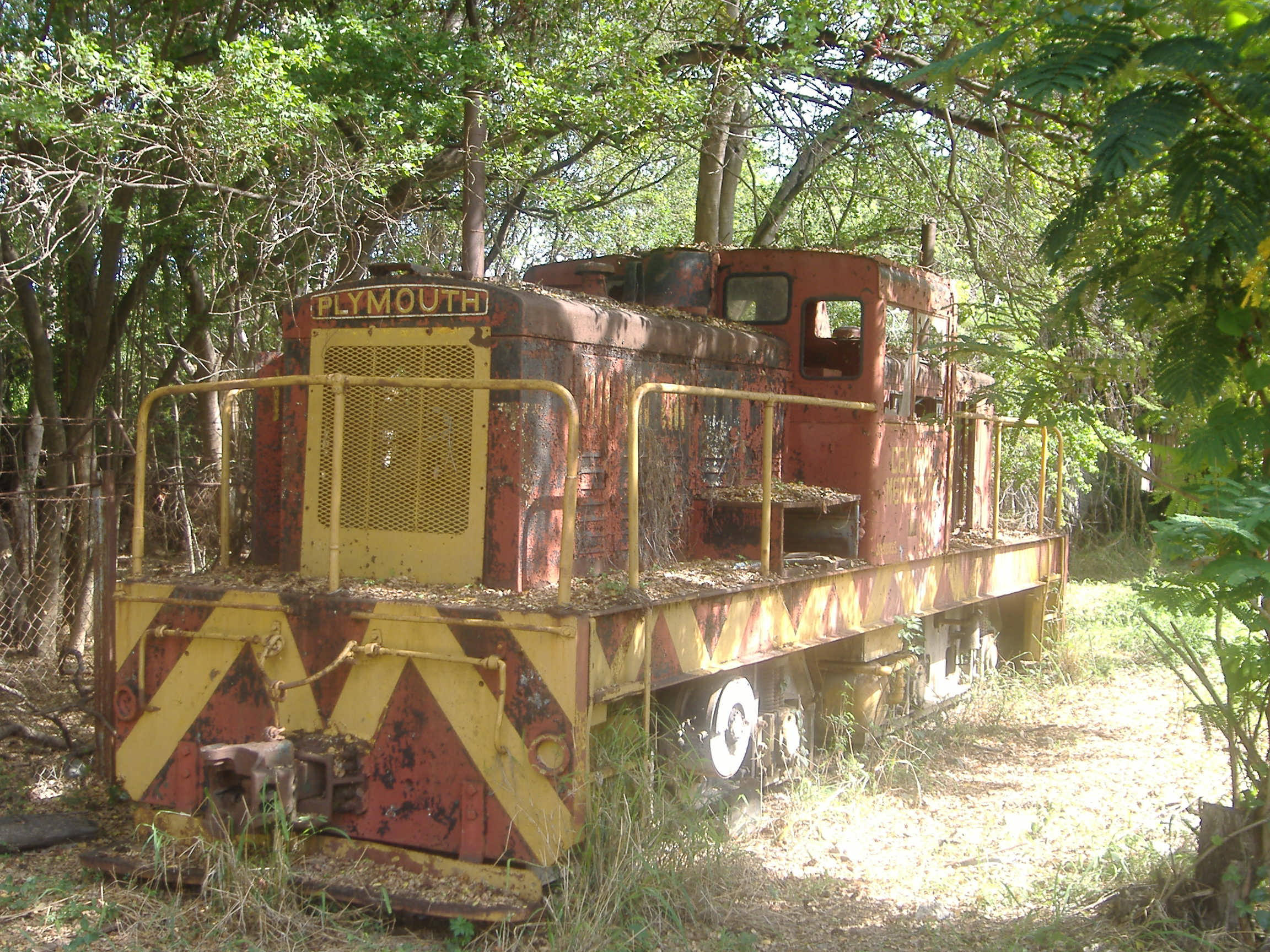
Abandoned Plymouth DE 50-ton locomotive on the grounds of the Central Mercedita sugarcane mill. The sugarcane plantation virtually became a company town of its own.

=== The sugar business ===
At the beginning of the 19th century, Don Sebastian Serrallés, a Spaniard from Begur, Girona, Catalonia, Spain, settled in Ponce and founded Hacienda Teresa. Following in his father's footsteps, Juan Serrallés Colón founded a sugarcane hacienda (plantation) in 1861 in Ponce and named it Hacienda Mercedita, in honor of his wife Mercedes Perez (1845–1922). The Hacienda quickly developed into a major sugar factory called Central Mercedita. According to Encyclopedia Puerto Rico, in 1862, just one year after its start-up, the sugar cane production at the Central Mercedita was so excellent that its owner started buying out neighboring sugar mills, including La Laurel, La Fe, Destierro, Bronce, Mallorquinas, Barrancas, La Teresa, Union, Mattei, Margarita, Cintrona, and rented the Cayo Verde sugar mill. Hacienda Mercedita produced sugar from sugarcane and packaged it at its nearby Snow White Sugar Company on the spacious flatlands complex of Central Mercedita, founded in 1949. The land area increased from the original 300 acres to the area currently (February 2015) bounded in the east by the municipality of Juana Diaz, in the north by barrio Coto Laurel, in the west by hacienda Mercedita proper at what is currently Destileria Serralles, and in the south by the Caribbean Sea.

=== The rum business ===
In 1865, Juan Serrallés Colon experimented with rum production at the Hacienda, producing his first casks of rum. He perfected his rum formula and the rum business grew rapidly. By 1890, Hacienda Mercedita produced over 4,000 acres (1,600 ha) of rum-making sugarcane.

For some time the Serrallés operation produced various local rum brands, most of which were short-lived. Inspired by the success of other rum producers in the island, the family decided to launch a refined brand with the intention of exporting it elsewhere. In 1932, the Ron Don Q brand was born and became popular with locals who considered rival Bacardi either harsher in taste or a foreign brand, as it was made in Cuba. In the 1930s, with money pouring in, Juan Serralles built a spacious new home for his family in his estate in Ponce, today called the Serralles Castle.

By 1953, the rum business had become highly successful and the Serrallés family built a new refinery incorporating modern equipment. By February 21, 1953, as the Hacienda was no longer a mostly residential facility, but had taken on more of an administrative role, its sugar cane corporation, Central Mercedita, Inc., was the center of most activity, purchasing sugarcane from local farmers and milling and processing it into cane sugar. Central Mercedita Inc. and its sister company, Puerto Rican Sugar Refinery, Inc., together engaged in Puerto Rico cane sugar production during this period. In the fall of 1971, these enterprises were doing business as Central Mercedita Co. and as Puerto Rico American Refinery, Inc.

In the 1950s, both the sugar cane and rum business stabilized and the Hacienda ran two parallel operations, one producing, packaging, selling, and distributing cane sugar under the Snow White brand and the other producing, packaging, selling, and distributing rum under the Don Q label. For the rum side of the house, Serralles incorporated a new company, Destilería Serrallés Inc.

== Life within the Hacienda ==
Originally designed as the residential quarters of its Serrallés owner and his family when it was built in 1861, the Hacienda took on a more industrial role in the following years, as the cane sugar business expanded rapidly, turning into the large Central Mercedita cane sugar factory. By the late 1870s, shortly after the abolition of slavery, the owners offered free garden plots both within and outside the Hacienda at the plantation in exchange for dependent resident labor force. The Hacienda established a general store where laborers bought goods on credit from the planter. "Planters paid wages in tokens that could only be used to buy goods at its grocery and general stores, thus hoping to create a cycle of indebtedness that would bind workers to their estates." The sugarcane plantation virtually became a company town, and eventually had its own rail line, workers' housing, transportation fleet, commissary, and private airport; which was later converted into a public commercial airport known as Ponce's Mercedita Airport.

== Demise ==
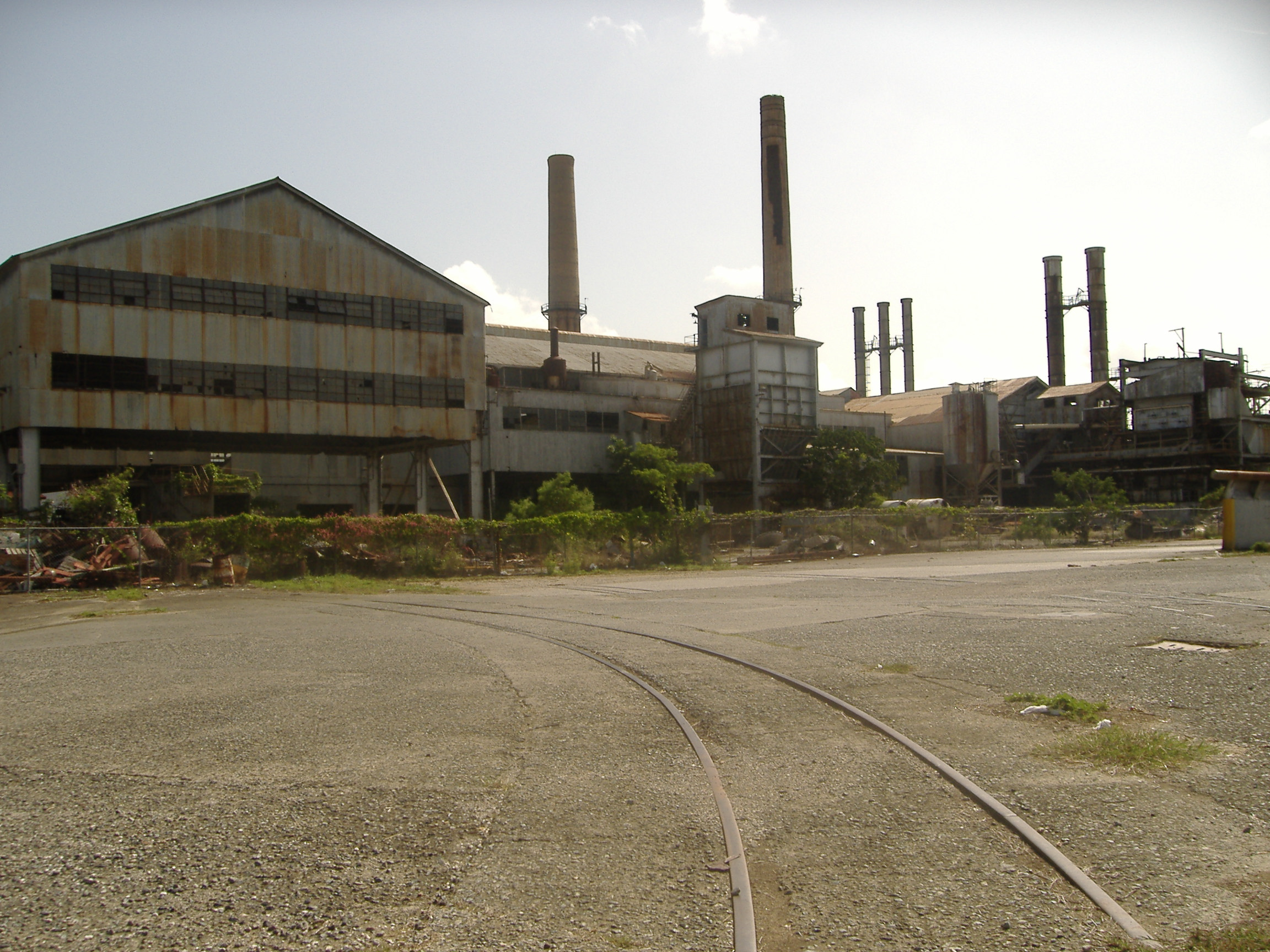
Ruins of the Snow White sugar refinery in Mercedita, Puerto Rico.

In 1973, the government of Puerto Rico created the Corporacion Azucarera de Puerto Rico (Puerto Rico Sugar Corporation, also known as Sugar Corporation of Puerto Rico) in an attempt to save the sugar industry, which for the previous two decades had been decaying. The new Corporation oversaw the operations of the remaining 13 sugarcane mills, including Central Mercedita, and those of the Snow White Sugar Refinery, the only sugar refinery left in the Island. The Puerto Rico Land Authority had ownership of the Snow White sugar refinery itself.

However, for a number of reasons, the new government corporation "immediately bled money." Ten years later, in 1983, the price of Mercedita's Snow White brand sugar was frozen by law in an attempt "to keep the voters happy." On 31 December 1994, Central Mercedita stopped the milling of sugarcane, but continued its sugar refining operations to accommodate other sugar cane mills in Puerto Rico that depended on it for their milling operations. However, 1994 is generally considered the closing date for the sugar mill. Shortly afterwards, sugar refining at Mercedita stopped altogether with the closing of the remaining sugarcane farms in the island. In 1998, the Government of Puerto Rico gave title to the homes and associated land to the remaining residents of the old Mercedita plantation.

== Intent to resurrect ==
In the fall of 2001, Sugar Corporation of Puerto Rico which owned the Mercedita sugar refinery and the Snow White sugar brand was contemplating the building of a sugar plant large enough to supply all 50,000 tons of sugar consumed each year in Puerto Rico.

== City park ==
The municipality of Ponce is attempting to acquire the grounds of the old Central Mercedita to convert it into a city park.

== Today ==
The community where the old Central Mercedita operated still stands. It too goes by the name "Central Mercedita". The main access road is PR-5506.

In June 2020, the hacienda served as a backdrop for an educational photoshoot of the traditional Puerto Rican Bomba dance.

== Timeline of important events ==
Following is a timeline listing the principal events, and their dates, in the life of Hacienda Mercedita.

- 1861 – Hacienda Mercedita founded (p. 23)
- 1869 – Mechanization started (p. 28)
- 1879 – Ox carts replaced by railroad system (p. 28)
- 1896 – Juan Serralles purchases nearby haciendas and incorporates them into Hacienda Mercedita: Hacienda Laurel, H. La Fe, H. Destierro, H. Bronce, H. Ponceña, and H. Cintrona (p. 33)
- 1914 – (11 April) Succession J. Serralles created (p. 34)
- 1926 – Joint venture with American investors create the Puerto Rican American Sugar Refining Inc. to produce white sugar (p. 38)
- 1949 – Central Mercedita Inc. is founded to process sugar cane form other haciendas (p. 40)
- 1963 – Central Mercedita buys outstanding shares of the Puerto Rican American Sugar Refining to become the sole owner (p. 40)
- 1969 – Another Serralles family business, Destileria Serralles (founded 1935), buys Central Mercedita (p. 40)
- 1979 – Central Mercedita is sold to the government of Puerto Rico, as the sugar cane industry is declining considerably (p. 45)
- 1995 – The Government of Puerto Rico shuts down Central Mercedita (p. 45)

== See also ==
- Destileria Serralles
- History of sugar
- Juan Serralles
- Mercedita Airport
- Museo Castillo Serrallés
- Ron Don Q
- Serralles Castle
- Ponce and Guayama Railroad
