= Juan Serrallés Colón =

Puerto Rican industrialist

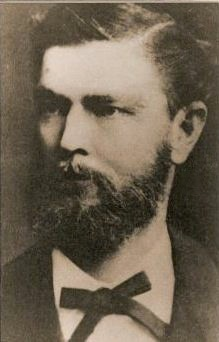
- Born: Juan Eugenio Serrallés Colón; 1836 (Note: Neysa Rodriguez Deynes, historian, writer and curator of Museo Castillo Serralles states Juan Serrallés Colón was born in 1834. See Neysa Rodriguez Deynes, El Museo Castillo Serrallés /The Serralles Castle Museum, published by Patronato del Castillo Serrallés, 1998, ISBN 0-9650059-0-9, p. 96.); Ponce, Puerto Rico
- Died: 1921 (age 85) (Note: Neysa Rodriguez Deynes, historian, writer and curator of Museo Castillo Serrallés states Juan Serrallés Colón died in 1897. See Neysa Rodriguez Deynes, El Museo Castillo Serrallés /The Serralles Castle Museum, published by Patronato del Castillo Serrallés, 1998, ISBN 0-9650059-0-9, p. 96.); Ponce, Puerto Rico
- Occupation: Businessman

Juan Eugenio Serrallés Colón (1836–1921) was the founder of Hacienda Mercedita in Ponce, Puerto Rico, and what was to become Destileria Serralles, producers of "Don Q", a brand of Puerto Rican rum.

== Family and early years ==
Juan Serrallés Colón, born in Ponce, Puerto Rico, was the son of Sebastian Serrallés, a wealthy Spaniard from Catalonia who settled in Ponce in the early 19th century and went into the sugarcane business, and Juana Colon. Serrallés Colón was the owner of "Hacienda Mercedita" as well as the neighboring Hacienda Fe and Hacienda Laurel.

Juan Serrallés was raised in Ponce and educated in Spain. When Juan Serrallés returned to the island, he returned to lead the work in his hacienda (plantation).

== "Don Q" rum ==
In 1865, Juan imported a still which he purchased in France and produced his first few casks of rum. He named the rum Don Q in honor of the legendary Spanish fictional character Don Quixote. Soon after, the "Don Q" brand of rum became very popular in Puerto Rico and the family business began to grow.

In 1903 the Serrallés family, under the leadership of Juan Serrallés, installed the first continuous still in Puerto Rico. Juan Serrallés died in 1921 just as the production of rum was being halted because of the United States Prohibition Act of the 1920s. Juan's family continued to run the sugar side of the business but for the distillery side started to produce medical alcohol instead of the outlawed rum. It was called Alcoholado Superior 70.

== Personal life ==
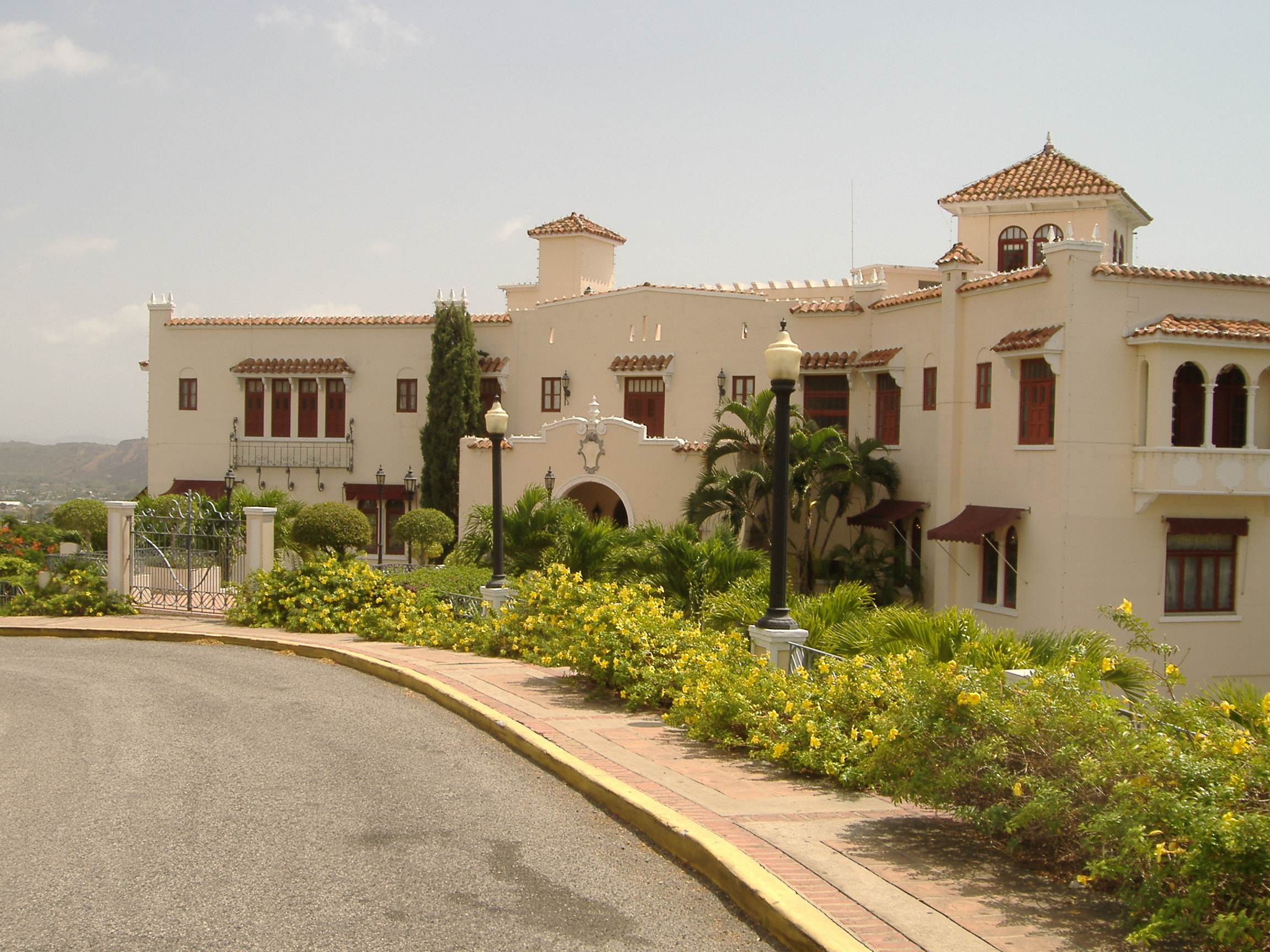
The Serralles Castle, built by Juan's son, Juan Eugenio Serralles Perez in the 1930s

Juan Serrallés Colón married Mercedes Perez (1845–1922), after whom he named his sugar plantation. They had three sons and two daughters. His eldest son, Juan Eugenio Serrallés, became the head of the Serrallés family business after Juan died in 1921. Juan's grandchildren – via Juan Eugenio's marriage to Rosa Maria Sanchez – were Rosa, Juan Eugenio, and Felix Juan.

Juan Eugenio built a huge castle in Ponce, called the Serralles Castle, for his three children some ten years after his father's death, a testament to the prosperity of the plantation business that Juan Serrallés had started the previous century. Eventually one of these grandchildren, Felix Juan, became the next in line to run the sugar plantation and rum distillery businesses, which he did until his death in 1985.

== Currently ==
The sugarcane business ceased to operate in 1994, with only the rum distillery that Juan had spearheaded decades before still operating. Today, Juan Serrallés Colón's great-grandson, Felix Juan Serrallés, Jr., presides over Destileria Serralles, Inc.

== Legacy ==
The Government of the Commonwealth of Puerto Rico has honored the memory of Juan Serrallés Colon by naming both a grade school and a high school in Ponce after him. There is also an elementary school named after his wife Mercedes.

== Descendants ==
Descendants of Juan Serrallés Colón

16. Juan Serrallés Colón; b. 1845 Ponce, Puerto Rico d. 1921
8. Juan Eugenio Serrallés Perez; b. 1878– & Mercedes M., Julia, Jorge Juan, Pedro Juan
17. Mercedes Perez; b. 1845 Ponce, Puerto Rico
4. Felix Juan Serrallés Sanchez; b. 3 February 1911, Ponce, Puerto Rico d. November 1985, Mercedita, Puerto Rico & Rosa M., Juan E.
9. Rosa Maria Sanchez Montalvo
2. Felix Juan Serrallés Nevares; b. 1934, Ponce, Puerto Rico & Roberto Juan, Frances Margarita, Juan Oscar, Michael
10. Oscar Nevares Lopez; b. 30 August 1888, Toa Alta, Puerto Rico
5. Francisca Victoria Nevares del Valle; b. 7 November 1914 Toa Baja, Puerto Rico
11. Margarita del Valle Morales; b. 8 September 1894, Arecibo, Puerto Rico
1. Felix Juan Serrallés Yordan; b. 1958– & Dianne Mercedes, Gisele Mercedes, Juan Oscar, Roberto Juan
12.
6.
13.
3. Hercilia Daiana Yordan; b. 1937, Ponce
14.
7.
15.

== See also ==
- List of Puerto Ricans
- Serralles Castle
- Destilería Serrallés
- Don Q
- Ponce, Puerto Rico
