= Castillo Serrallés =

Castle/mansion in Ponce, Puerto Rico

- Castillo de Serralles (Note: The name of the castillo is presented here without the accent on "Serrallés" in conformance with the usage in the house's National Register nomination form and Federal Register announcement of listing.)
- U.S. National Register of Historic Places
- Puerto Rico Historic Sites and Zones
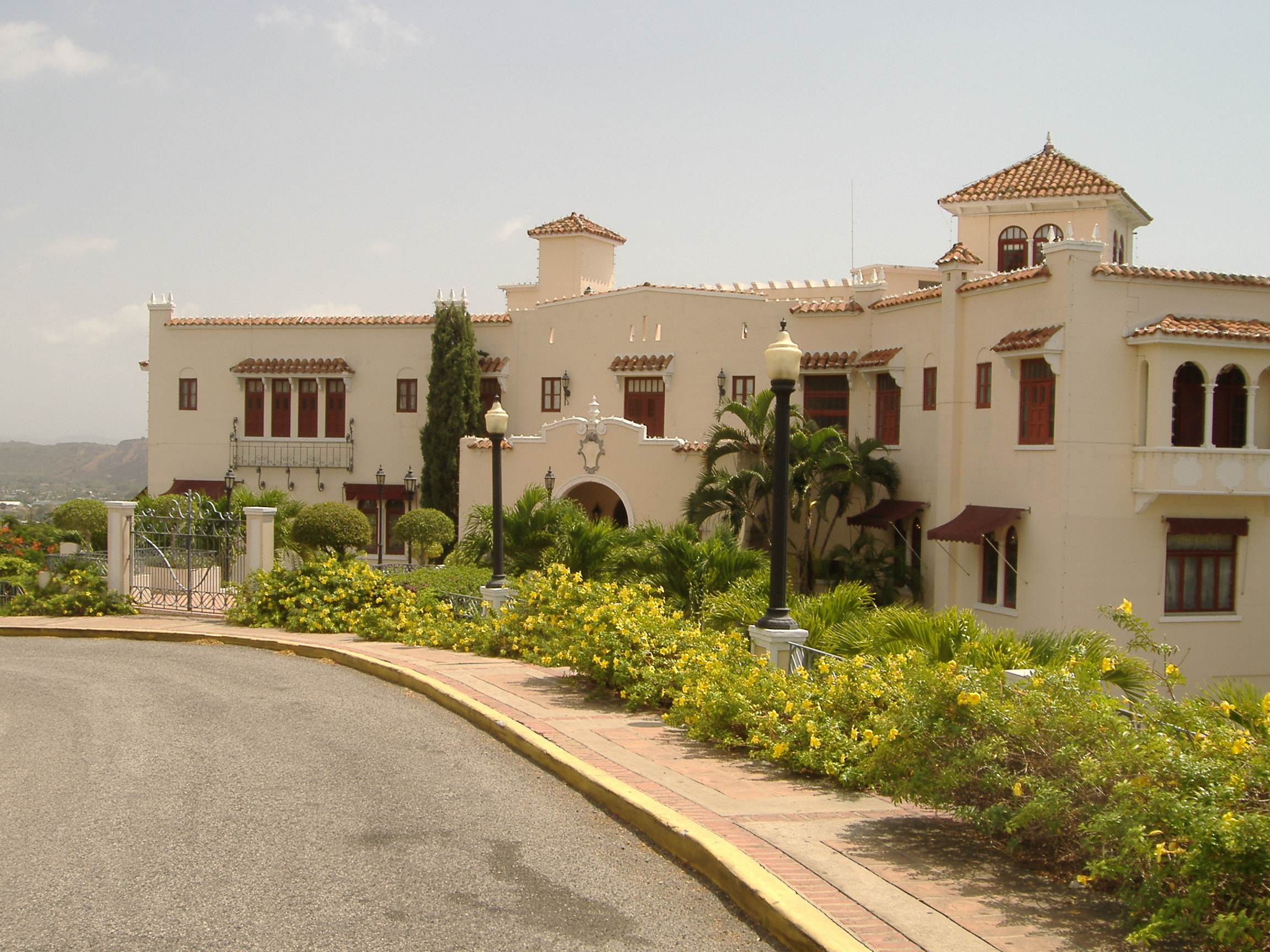
- Castillo Serrallés in 2007

- Location within Puerto Rico
- Location: Ponce, Puerto Rico
- Coordinates: 18°01′07″N 66°37′09″W
- Area: 2.5 acres (1.0 ha)
- Built: 1930
- Architect: Pedro Adolfo de Castro
- Architectural style: Spanish Colonial Revival
- NRHP reference No.: 80004494
- RNSZH No.: 2001-(RS)-23-JP-SH

Significant dates
- Added to NRHP: 3 November 1980
- Designated RNSZH: May 16, 2001

Castillo Serrallés (English: Serralles Castle) is a mansion located in the city of Ponce, Puerto Rico, overlooking the downtown area (Ponce Pueblo). It was built during the 1930s for Juan Eugenio Serrallés, son of businessman Juan Serrallés, founder of Destilería Serrallés. The structure sits on a 2.5-acre (1.0 ha) exceedingly manicured property. Nowadays, the structure functions as a museum, Museo Castillo Serrallés, with information about the sugar cane and rum industries and its impact in the economy of Puerto Rico. It is also increasingly used as a venue for social activities, including destination weddings. The property was listed in the National Register of Historic Places in 1980 and on the Puerto Rico Register of Historic Sites and Zones in 2001. In 1996, the structure was featured in the American TV series America's Castles.

== History ==
The house was purchased by the city of Ponce from the Serrallés heirs. While the castle was valued at US$17–US$25 million, it was purchased for a mere US$400,000 and included much of the furniture in the sale. The city's initial intent was to turn it into a museum of Puerto Rican music. The Museum of Puerto Rican Music was eventually established elsewhere in the city.

The mansion was emptied in 1956, and while the structure kept in very good shape, the grounds were overgrown by weeds to the point that a total landscaping plan was needed to return the estate to its past glory. In 1980, the property was still owned by Rosa Serrallés Torruella and Felix J. Serrallés Sanchez.

== Location ==
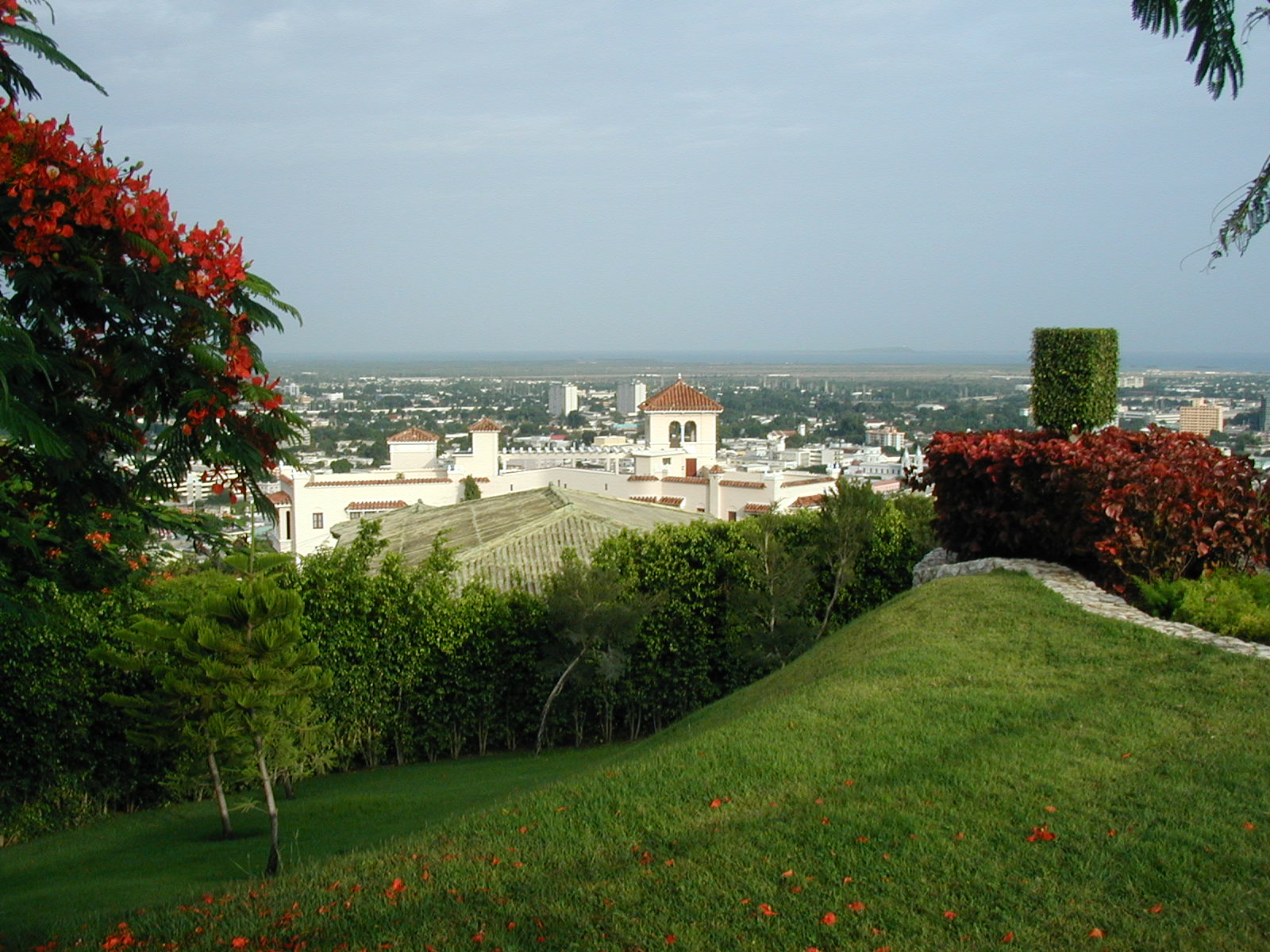
El Vigia and Castillo Serralles

The mansion was built on the south side of Cerro del Vigía (Del Vigía hill), which is the most prominent and nearest hill to the Ponce Historic Zone. Its location has the mansion overlooking the city of Ponce. Cerro del Vigía is the name of one of the hills to the north of the city of Ponce that make up the foothills of the Cordillera Central found further inland. The location of the mansion, together with its landscape, and many architectural details, have made it unique among other Puerto Rico mansions. Its location atop the Cerro del Vigía hill makes it visible from nearly every part of the city of Ponce, "as a constant reminder to all Ponceños of their heritage". The building's location, coupled with its "Y" shape form, allows for a view of the city of Ponce from any one of its eastern, southern, or western elevations.

== Significance ==
The Serrallés mansion was built as the exclusive residence of Don Juan Eugenio Serrallés, a leader in the sugar cane industry during the early part of the 20th century. The building is significant from both the architectural and historical perspectives.

Architecturally, the building represents an example of Spanish Moroccan architecture, the style first introduced in Puerto Rico by the architect Pedro Adolfo de Castro. Three examples of this style of architecture were: El Castillo de Valdes in Mayagüez, el Castillo de Mario Mercado Montalvo in Guayanilla, and el Castillo de Serrallés. In the 1920s, other similar mansions were built in Puerto Rico, but Castillo Serrallés is the best preserved. Historically, the building is a reminder of the cultural and economic changes that southern Puerto Rico experienced in the 1920s. "Ponce's dependence on the sugar cane industry at the close of the nineteenth century, created an atmosphere of development from which evolved a series of intrinsic cultural characteristics and afforded great wealth to many families involved in the industry. The wealthy families generally chose Europe as the model for the direction that cultural endeavors would take."

According to the Puerto Rico State Historic Preservation Office, "European fashions and lifestyles were usually preferred in this part of the Island...The result of [the] intense cultural interest [of the time] provided work for artists, artisans, and architects whose creations tended to strengthen the image of the ethnic identity...Even though El Castillo Serralles is not based on an indigenous design, its architectural significance lies in the fact that it was designed to adapt well with Caribbean climatic conditions. Its workmanship, its interior decorations, its furniture, and even its floor plan, reflect the cultural attitudes of the times".

== Physical characteristics ==
The castle was built in 1930 by local architect Pedro Adolfo de Castro y Besosa. It includes two huge terraces, an outside fountain, and a symmetrical backyard garden. Its interior includes a luxurious hall, a spacious dining room, and an interior courtyard.

The house has four floors. The ground floor houses the garage and a basement used as service quarters. The second floor contains the library, a central patio, a solarium, the living room, dining room, and the kitchen. The third floor contains all the sleeping quarters. The fourth floor is the terrace, from where the most impressive and commanding views of the city are possible. Intended as a relaxed entertainment space, the terrace has both covered and uncovered areas. Its flooring is all tiled.

Access to the main entrance to the house from the front street, and leading to the second level of the north elevation, is by way of either of two semi-circular stairways which run from the covered carriage entrance on the ground level of the north elevation. This leads to double French doors which open into a large vestibule reception area with a ceramic tile floor. The view from this room reveals an open courtyard patio with a fountain. The formal living room is located to the left of the vestibule. The living room is the only room with a parquet floor.

The building was constructed entirely of concrete. The mansion was designed in a style popular in the 1920s for representing Spanish Mediterranean influence. Prominent throughout the building is the use of wooden round arches over the building's large windows and doorways, many of them adorned with small stained glass panes. Some openings are also decorated in ornate iron work. The two towers that accentuate the building's eastern and western sides have red roof tiles. This accent is also present on all other rooftops. The exterior of the buildings is finished in stucco.

== In the movies ==
Scenes from the Disney Channel original movie Princess Protection Program were filmed in the castle.

== See also ==
- Juan Serrallés
- Destilería Serrallés
- Don Q
- Ponce, Puerto Rico
- Casa Serrallés
