= Don Q =

Puerto Rican rum

Ron Don Q
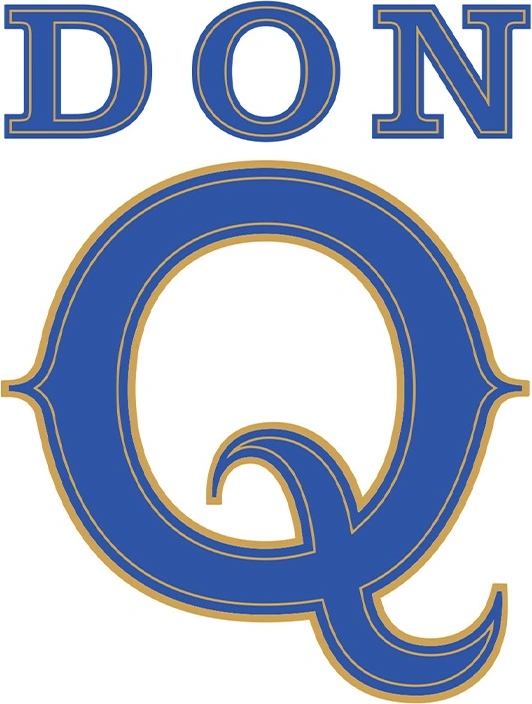
- Inventor: Juan Serrallés Colón
- Inception: 1865; 161 years ago
- Manufacturer: Destilería Serrallés
- Website: donq.com

Don Q is a Puerto Rican rum, distilled, manufactured, bottled, and distributed by Destilería Serrallés from its corporate facility in Ponce, Puerto Rico. Don Q, "Puerto Rico's best-known rum", is the top-selling rum in Puerto Rico, where over 70% of the rum consumed in the United States is produced. The rum derives its name from Don Quixote, the protagonist in Miguel de Cervantes' classic Spanish novel. The rum is sold internationally, competing against Bacardi for market share. Available in the continental United States since June 2009, Don Q continues to outsell Bacardi in Puerto Rico.

== History ==
The Serrallés family migrated from Catalonia to Puerto Rico in the mid-1830s, and established a sugar cane plantation in the outskirts of Ponce. They were successful in harvesting and refining cane sugar and exporting it to the United States, the United Kingdom and France. The plantation became very prosperous, and virtually became a company town, with its own rail line, workers' housing, transportation fleet, commissary, and private—later public—airport (Ponce's Mercedita Airport). Most of these operations were eventually annexed to the municipality of Ponce, in whose lands the plantation is based.

In 1865, the family opened a rum manufacturer at the plantation, "Hacienda Mercedita". On that year, Juan Serrallés, who would go down as one of the most successful liquor salesmen in Puerto Rican history, imported a still from France, which enabled him to produce his first casks of rum.

The Serrallés operation produced various local rum brands, most of which were short-lived. Inspired by the success of other rum producers in the island, the family decided to launch a refined brand with the intention of exporting it elsewhere. The Don Q brand was launched in 1932, and became popular with locals who considered rival Bacardi either harsher in taste or a foreign brand. When Bacardí opened its distilling operations in Puerto Rico in the early 1930s, it was considered a Cuban brand since its headquarters were in Cuba. Since the 1960s Cuban revolution, Bacardi has had its headquarters in Bermuda, but produces most of its rum in Puerto Rico at the Cathedral of Rum.

By the 1960s, Don Q was available on most of Puerto Rico's important supermarket chains, such as Pueblo and others. It also became available at Amigo.

== Distillation process ==
Don Q is distilled from sugar cane. The combination of the type of yeasts employed for fermentation, distillation method, aging conditions, and blending determines the characteristic flavor of rum. Made with molasses, water, mash, and yeast, Don Q is distilled in a continuous still. Once distilled, the clear spirit is aged in oak barrels for up to a year per Puerto Rican law, adding a golden color and character to the rum. Flavors and spices, if any, are added as an option at this point. The brand's taste is achieved through a proprietary recipe, which is blended into the rum mixture at the final stages of production.

== Advertising and sales ==
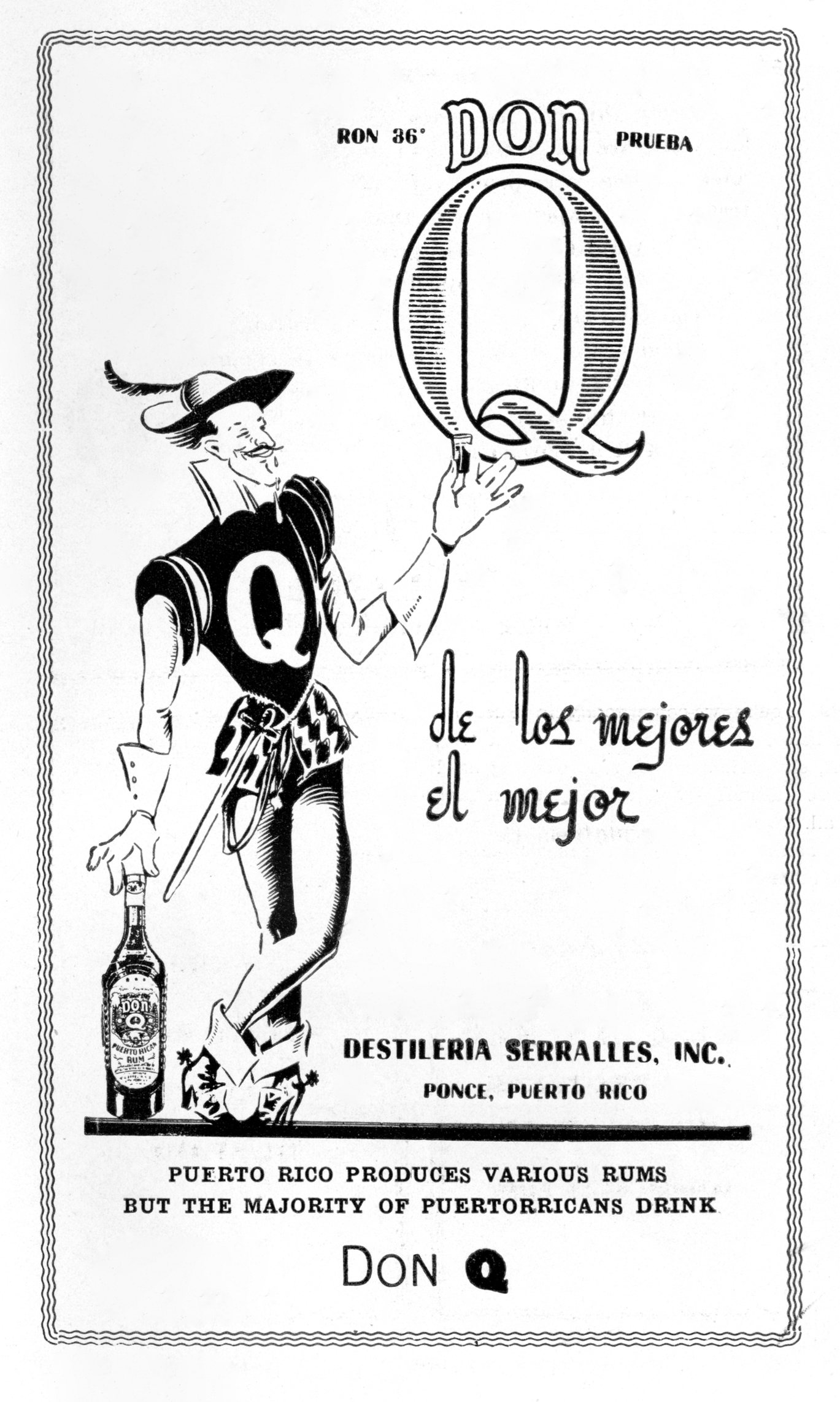
Don Q advertisement from 1949

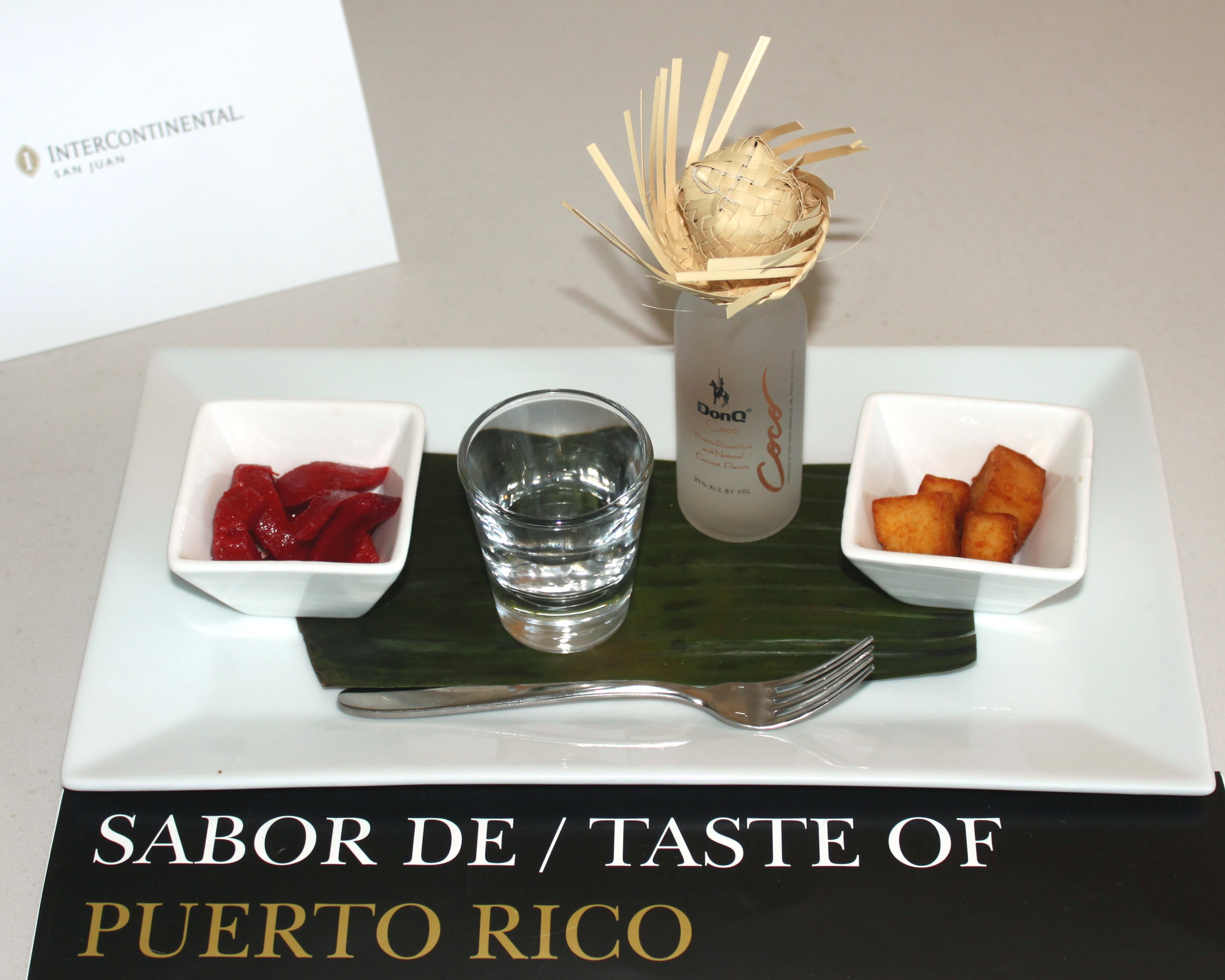
Don Q served at Intercontinental Hotel in San Juan, Puerto Rico

Currently, Don Q is sold in the United States, Mexico, the U.S. Virgin Islands, Spain, and a number of other countries. Don Q is the best-selling rum in Puerto Rico.

Destileria Serrallés has been engaged in numerous advertising campaigns for its rums. Television ads have run on Puerto Rican channels, and they have sponsored local sports teams, such as Ponce's Leones de Ponce baseball team and their BSN counterpart the Leones de Ponce basketball team. Don Q also has appeared on a number of films.

== International awards and recognitions ==
Despite focusing on the middle and lower end of the price spectrum, five of seven Don Q offerings have achieved a modicum of success at international spirit ratings competitions. For example, its Don Q Gran Añejo rum earned one double gold, two silver, and one bronze medals at the San Francisco World Spirits Competitions between 2008 and 2012.

Also, in 2010, Don Q scored high at the Spirits International Prestige (SIP) Awards, in San Diego, California. Competing against hundreds of rums from around the globe, Don Q Añejo, Don Q Gran Añejo, Don Q Cristal, Don Q Coco, Don Q Mojito and Don Q Limón were awarded rankings in the “Platinum-Best in Class” and “Gold” categories. In this competition, according to Alberto "Tito" Torruella Bartolomei, Don Q's VP for Manufacturing, all of the Don Q products brought to the competition received awards. Unlike other awards, the SIP Awards select consumers for judges. "It is not the first time that Destilería Serrallés receives an international award. In a recent competition in Las Vegas, Nevada, Don Q Cristal received the top award within the category “Best Mojito”. Don Q Oro also received an award.

In September 2011, the American Academy of Hospitality Sciences awarded Don Q Gran Añejo a five-star rating, something they "don't award to just any rum...In fact they found only one worthy enough of this honor: DonQ Gran Añejo...Gran Añejo is the first rum ever to receive this rare distinction, reserved for the greatest achievements in travel, hospitality products and services. The American Academy of Hospitality Sciences Board of Trustees recognized in Destilería Serrallés for DonQ Gran Añejo exceptional quality and character."

== In popular culture ==
Don Q has been featured in the 2012 motion picture comedy Ted. According to a July 5, 2012, article by Robert Haynes-Peterson in Examiner.com, "The DonQ in question turns up at a drug- and Flash Gordon-fueled party scene which also serves as a pivotal turning point in the story. Gearing up to do shots, Wahlberg grabs the nearest bottle of rum and turns it to the camera for a lingering several seconds." It is also mentioned in the song "Come Get Her" by Rae Sremmurd.

== Products ==
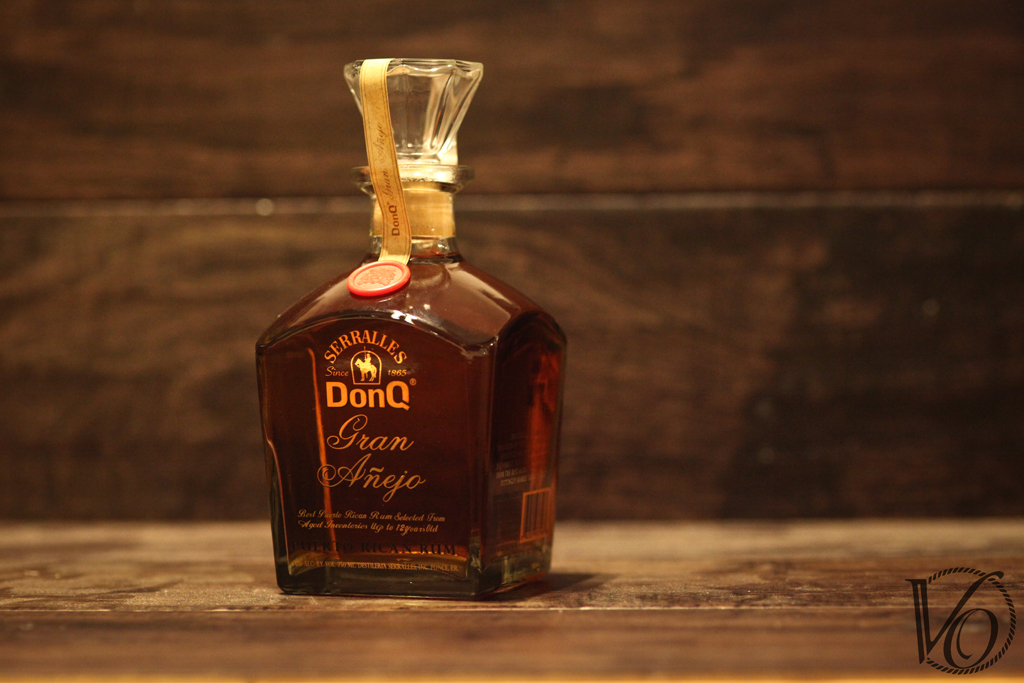
Don Q Gran Anejo

Don Q has been produced in a number of different types:

- Don Q Cristal
- Don Q Limón (Lime Flavored Rum)
- Don Q Pasión (Passion Fruit Flavored Rum)
- Don Q Coco (Coconut Flavored Rum)
- Don Q Mojito (Lime & Mint Flavored Rum)
- Don Q Gold
- Don Q 151
- Don Q Añejo
- Don Q Gran Añejo
- Don Q Double Aged Rum
- Don Q Signature Release Single Barrel 2007
- Don Q Oak Barrel Spiced

Small sample bottles of the Don Q are also available at supermarkets, pharmacies, and liquor stores.

== See also ==
- List of Puerto Rican rums
- Juan Serralles
- Castillo Serrallés
- Destilería Serrallés
- Ponce, Puerto Rico
