= Destilería Serrallés =

Rum producer located in Ponce, Puerto Rico

Coordinates: 18°0′55.008″N 66°33′53.1714″W

Destilería Serrallés Inc.
- Type: Private
- Industry: Distilled beverages
- Founded: Ponce, Captaincy General of Puerto Rico (1865)
- Headquarters: Ponce, Puerto Rico
- Key people: Félix Juan Serrallés, Jr. President and CEO (1990? - c. 2019); Philippe Brechot (c. 2019 - present)
- Products: Rum, vodka, medicinal alcohol
- Revenue: $114.24 M USD(July 2011
- Number of employees: 400, over 600 on payroll
- Website: www.destileriaserralles.com

Destilería Serrallés is a rum producer located in Ponce, Puerto Rico, and best known for its Don Q rum brand. The company is Puerto Rico's oldest family-owned company and has revenues of over 100 million dollars. In 2011, it was responsible for pumping over $300 million annually into the Puerto Rican economy from the sale of its rums in the United States mainland alone.

== History ==
The history of Destilería Serrallés is the history of the Serrallés family. The Serrallés family was a Spanish family from Catalonia that established its links to Puerto Rico in the mid-1830s. They were successful in harvesting and refining cane sugar and exporting it to the United States, the United Kingdom and France. The sugar cane plantation they built virtually became a company town, and eventually had its own rail line, workers' housing, transportation fleet, commissary, and private—later public—airport (Ponce's Mercedita Airport). Most of these operations were eventually annexed to the municipality of Ponce, in whose lands the plantation is based. Sugar cane molasses imported from the Dominican Republic is still transformed into rum until now at the same Serralles distilling facility that has been used for over a century.

== Mercedita ==
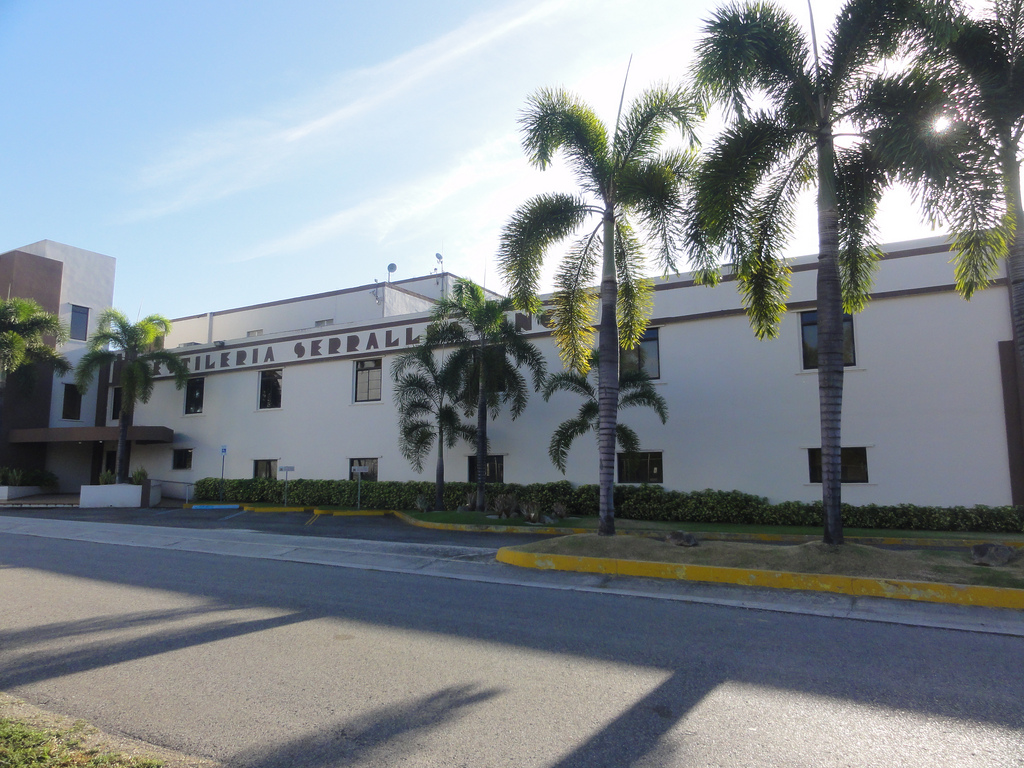
Destileria Serralles Administrative Offices, Sector Mercedita, Barrio Vayas, Ponce, Puerto Rico

In 1865, the family opened a rum manufacturing facility at their plantation, the "Hacienda Mercedita", named honoring the Serrallés family matriarch, Mercedes Perez. In that year, Juan Serralles Colon, who would go down as one of the most successful liquor salesmen in Puerto Rican history, imported a still from France, which enabled him to produce his first casks of rum.

== Don Q ==
The Serrallés operation produced various local rum brands, most of which were short-lived. Inspired by the success of other rum producers on the island, the family launched a refined brand intending to export it elsewhere. The Ron Don Q brand was launched in 1932, and became popular with locals who considered rival Bacardi either harsher in taste or a foreign brand (Bacardí opened its distilling operations in Puerto Rico in the early 1930s, and at the time it was considered a Cuban brand, since its headquarters were in Santiago de Cuba). By the 1960s, Ron Don Q was available in most of Puerto Rico's important supermarket chains, such as Pueblo and others. It also became available at Amigo. In addition to rum, the distillery also produces medicinal alcohol, plus wine, vodka, and Don Juan.

== Acquisition of Puerto Rico Distillers ==
In 1985, Serrallés, Inc., under the leadership of Felix Juan Serrallés, Sr., purchased Puerto Rico Distillers, Inc., from the Canadian liquor giant Joseph E. Seagram and Sons, LTD. The Company grew rapidly when it bought Puerto Rico Distillers in 1985. This acquisition increased the company's product line to include Palo Viejo, Ron Llave and Granado, and doubled the firm's sales. The acquisitions included manufacturing facilities in Camuy and Arecibo plus the brand names sold by Seagrams locally such as: "Palo Viejo", "Ron Llave" and "Granado". Serrallés also purchased the rights to produce and distribute the brands of "Ronrico" and "Captain Morgan" in Puerto Rico and the rest of the Caribbean. These same brands, now produced by Serrallés, are distributed in the United States by Seagrams. Captain Morgan rum is the third largest selling rum in the world after Tanduay and Bacardi. As a result, Serrallés, Inc., more than doubled its sales.

== Distribution ==
The company's flagship product, Ron Don Q, is currently sold in the United States, Mexico, the Virgin Islands, Spain, and a number of other countries. Serrallés USA, the USA distribution company of Destilería Serrallés, is based in Stamford, Connecticut.

== Competition ==
Ron Don Q is the best-selling rum in Puerto Rico, ahead of Bacardi and Captain Morgan. The Captain Morgan Rum brand is owned by Diageo PLC but made by Destilería Serrallés in a different Puerto Rican distillery under a supply contract. In 2008, Diageo's Captain Morgan contract with Serrallés was not renewed, as Diageo's moved its production of Captain Morgan to the U.S. Virgin Islands.

== Awards ==
The company has been the recipient of several awards, among them are the Green Award by the magazine The Drinks Business for their implementation of renewable energy in their company facilities. Serrallés was also honored with the World Class Distillery 2019 prize by World Spirit Awards.

== Advertising ==
Ron Don Q has also been engaged in numerous advertising campaigns. Television ads have run on Puerto Rican channels for decades, and the brand has sponsored local sports teams, such as baseball's Leones de Ponce and their BSN basketball counterpart, the basketball Leones. The Serrallés distillery also sponsors the "Copa Serralles" boat race, where Ron Don Q is prominently advertised. Don Q also has appeared on a number of films. Don Q rum is available in small bottle samples at supermarkets, pharmacies and liquor stores. Proof66.com, an aggregator of liquor ratings from various experts, places the Don Q Añejo in the Top 10th percentile of all rums.

== Currently ==
The company's current president and CEO is Philippe Brechot. The company currently produces over 60% of the rum sold in Puerto Rico. In 1998, the annual sales of Serrallés. Inc. surpassed $100 million. The company has become a large industrial and marketing enterprise that produces and distributes over 80 different product lines worldwide.

Since 2000, the Grupo Serralles which includes the distillery companies also owns the Ponce Hilton & Casino. It is one of America's 100 oldest family-owned businesses.

== See also ==
- Juan Serralles
- Castillo Serrallés
- Don Q
- Ponce, Puerto Rico
