= List of museums in Ponce, Puerto Rico =

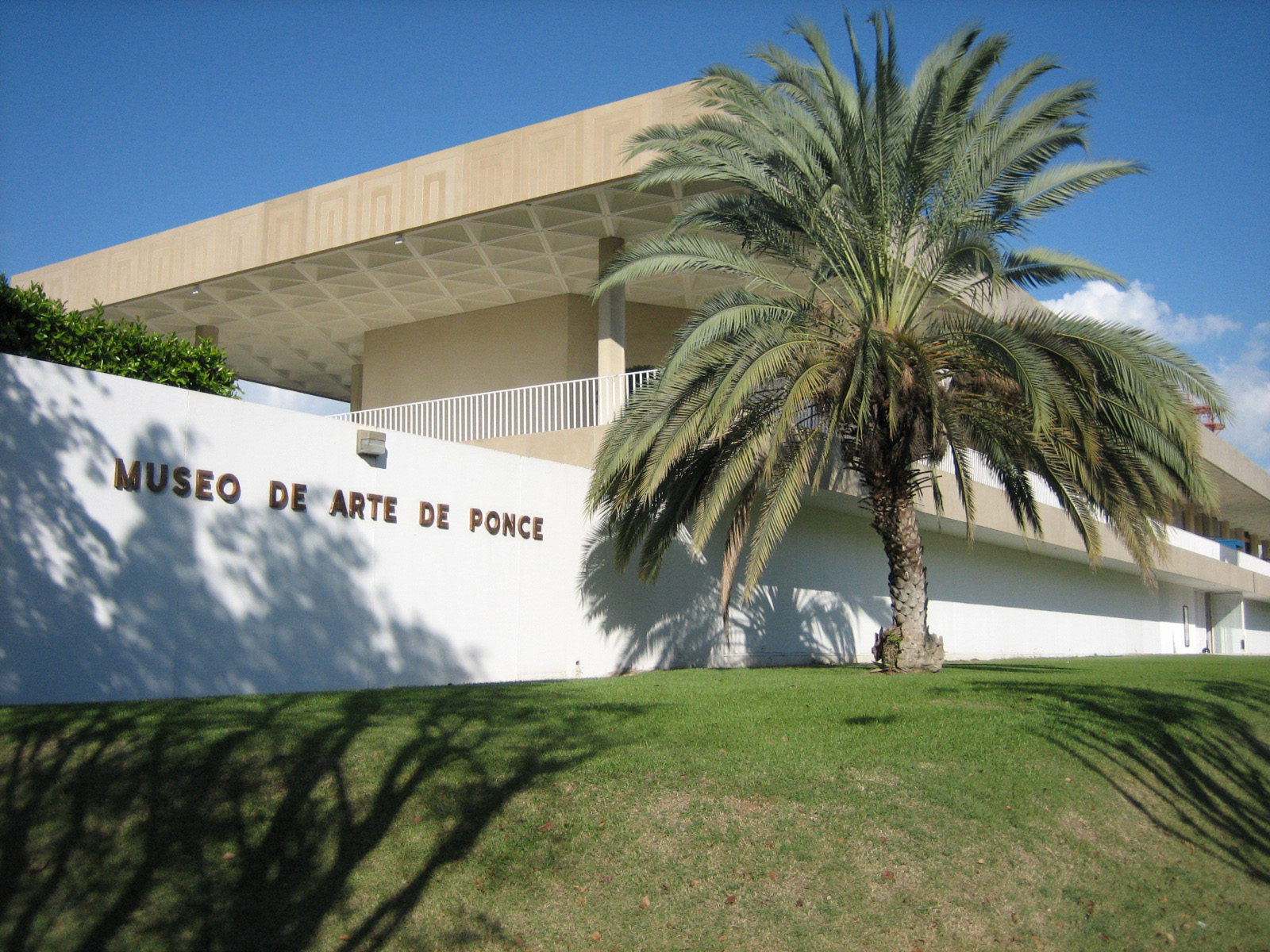
World-class Museo de Arte de Ponce, the jewel in the crown of Ponce museums

This is a list of museums in Ponce, Puerto Rico. Both, museums in the city proper as well as Ponce's rural areas are listed. One unique feature about Ponce museums is that the majority of them are housed in historic structures listed in the National Register of Historic Places. In those cases, the listing below also provided that NRHP registry number.

== Museum list summary table ==
Note: The table that follows lists museums by their year of founding, that is, their year of opening. A listing sorted by any of the other fields can be obtained by clicking on the header of the field. For example, clicking on "Barrio" will sort museums by their barrio location.

| No. | Name | Photo | Barrio | Location | Type/Use | Year Structure Built | Year Museum Opened | Building Architect | Museum Curator | Style | National Register of Historic Places Listing Number |
|---|---|---|---|---|---|---|---|---|---|---|---|
| 1 | Museo de Arte de Ponce | | Canas Urbano | Avenida Las Américas | Art museum | 1965 | 1959 | Edward Durell Stone | Cheryl Hartup | Modern | N/A |
| 2 | Centro Ceremonial Indígena de Tibes | | Tibes | PR-504, km 2.5 | Archaeology museum | 1982 | 1982 | Unk | Ponce Municipal Government | Modern | 78003381 |
| 3 | Museo Hacienda Buena Vista | | Magueyes | PR-123 km. 16.8 | Farm museum | 1933 | 1986 | Unk | Fideicomiso de Conservación | Spanish Colonial & Ponce Creole | 91001499 |
| 4 | Museo Casa Paoli | | Cuarto | C. Mayor, between Luna and Jobos | Biographical museum | 1864 | 1987 | Manuel V. Domenech | Néstor Murray-Irizarry? | Neoclassical | 09000769 |
| 5 | Museo de la Masacre de Ponce | | Cuarto | C. Marina NB and C. Luna WB | Human rights museum | 1910 | 1988 | Blas Silva | ICP | Ponce Creole | 05001098 |
| 6 | Museo Parque de Bombas | | Segundo | Plaza Las Delicias | Firefighting museum | 1882 | 1990 | Maximo de Meana y Guridi | Pablo Ojeda O'Neill | Gothic Revival, Victorian, Moorish Revival | 84003150 |
| 7 | Museo de la Música Puertorriqueña | | Tercero | C. Cristina EB and C. Salud NB | Music museum | 1911 | 1990 | Alfredo Wiechers Pieretti | ICP | Neoclassical | N/A |
| 8 | Museo Castillo Serrallés | | Portugues Urbano | C. Bertoly Final, then Paseo de la Cruceta | Agricultural museum | 1933 | 1991 | Pedro Adolfo de Castro | Neysa Rodríguez Deynes | Spanish Colonial Revival | 80004494 |
| 9 | Museo Francisco "Pancho" Coimbre | | Quinto | C. Castillo EB and C. Lolita Tizol | Sports museum | 1910 | 1992 | Unk | Hector L. Ortiz? | Art Deco | N/A |
| 10 | Museo de la Historia de Ponce | | Tercero | C. Cristina EB and C. Mayor SB | City history museum | 1911 | 1992 | Blas Silva | Maruja Candal Salazar and Neysa Rodriguez Deynes | Classical revival, Art Nouveau, Spanish Revival | 88000663 |
| 11 | Museo de la Arquitectura Ponceña | | Segundo | C. Reina WB and C. Mendez Vigo NB | Architecture museum | 1912 | 1996 | Alfredo Wiechers Pieretti | ICP | Spanish Colonial Revival | 84003151 |
| 12 | Museo Caja de Muertos | | Playa @ Caja de Muertos | Southern end of the Island, next to the Guard Barracks | Marine museum | 2005 | 2005 | Troop 104, Juana Diaz | ICP and DRNA | Modern | N/A |
| 13 | Museo del Autonomismo Puertorriqueño | | Segundo | At PNRBC, C. Torre Final NB | Political history museum | 1842 | 2006 | Nieto Blajol Iglesia | Neysa Rodríguez Deynes | Modern | 84003149 |
| 14 | Museo Casa Armstrong-Poventud | | Segundo | Across from Ponce Cathedral | Historic house museum | 1899 | 2008 | Manuel V. Domenech | ICP | Neoclassical | 87001821 |
| 15 | Museo de la Recordación | | Tercero | C. Salud SB and C. Cristina EB | Natural disaster museum | 1926 | 2012 | Unk | Ponce Municipal Government | Spanish Colonial Revival | 78003381 |
| 16 | Museo Fundación-Biblioteca Rafael Hernández Colón | | Tercero | C. Mayor NB and C. Castillo EB | Political history museum | 2015 | 1992 | Manuel V. Domenech | Unk | Neoclassical | N/A |
| 17 | Panteón Nacional Román Baldorioty de Castro | | Segundo | C. Torre Final NB | Cemetery museum | 1842 | 1992 | Antonio Torruella | Unk | Neoclassical | 84003149 |
| 18 | Museo de Arqueología de la Pontificia Universidad Católica de Puerto Rico | | Canas Urbano | Biblioteca Encarnación Valdés, Avenida Las Américas EB | Archaeology museum | 1948 | 1982 | Unk | PUCPR | Modern | N/A |

Key:
C. = Calle (street)
NB = Northbound
SB = Southbound
WB = Westbound
EB = Eastbound
Unk = Unknown
N/A = Not applicable

== See also ==
- List of museums in Puerto Rico
