= Museo Hacienda Buena Vista =

Farm museum in Ponce, Puerto Rico

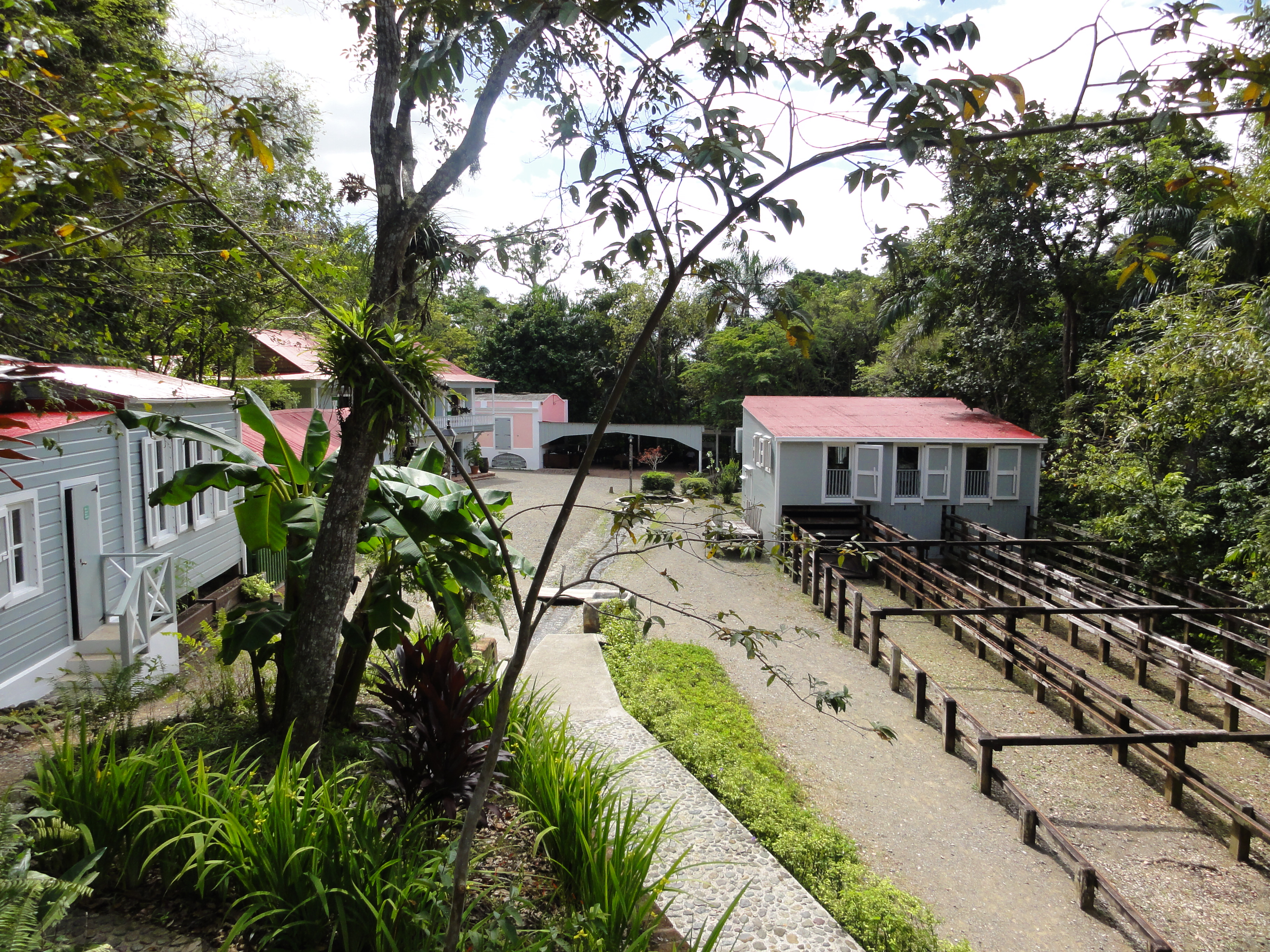
- Partial view of Museo Hacienda Buena Vista complex

- Location within Puerto Rico
- Established: 1987
- Location: Ponce, Puerto Rico
- Coordinates: 18°5′4″N 66°39′16″W
- Type: Farm museum
- Visitors: 40,000/year
- Curator: Fideicomiso de Conservación de Puerto Rico
- Owners: Private: Fideicomiso de Conservación de Puerto Rico.
- Website: http://www.fideicomiso.org/

Museo Hacienda Buena Vista is a historic coffee plantation farm museum in Barrio Magueyes, Ponce, Puerto Rico. The museum opened in 1987, and receives some 40,000 visitors a year. The museum has been described as "Puerto Rico's first living museum of art and science."

The original plantation belonged to the Vives family and dates from the 19th century. The structures and land are now owned by the Fideicomiso de Conservación (Puerto Rico Conservation Trust), who operates the museum. It is located on 81.79 acres (331,000 m^{2}) of fertile land that includes a humid subtropical forest some 7 miles (11 km) north of Ponce on Route PR-123, in Corral Viejo, a community in Barrio Magueyes.

Museo Hacienda Buena Vista is today a well-known educational destination. The machinery of the original Hacienda has been put in motion again, farm animals roam the grounds, the farmhouse rooms have been furnished, and the scent of freshly roasted coffee fills the surrounding air. Visitors can take tours through the old Vives country home and explore the plantation buildings and grounds. Authentic 19th-century farm machinery is exhibited that shows how a coffee plantation worked in the 1880s.

== History ==
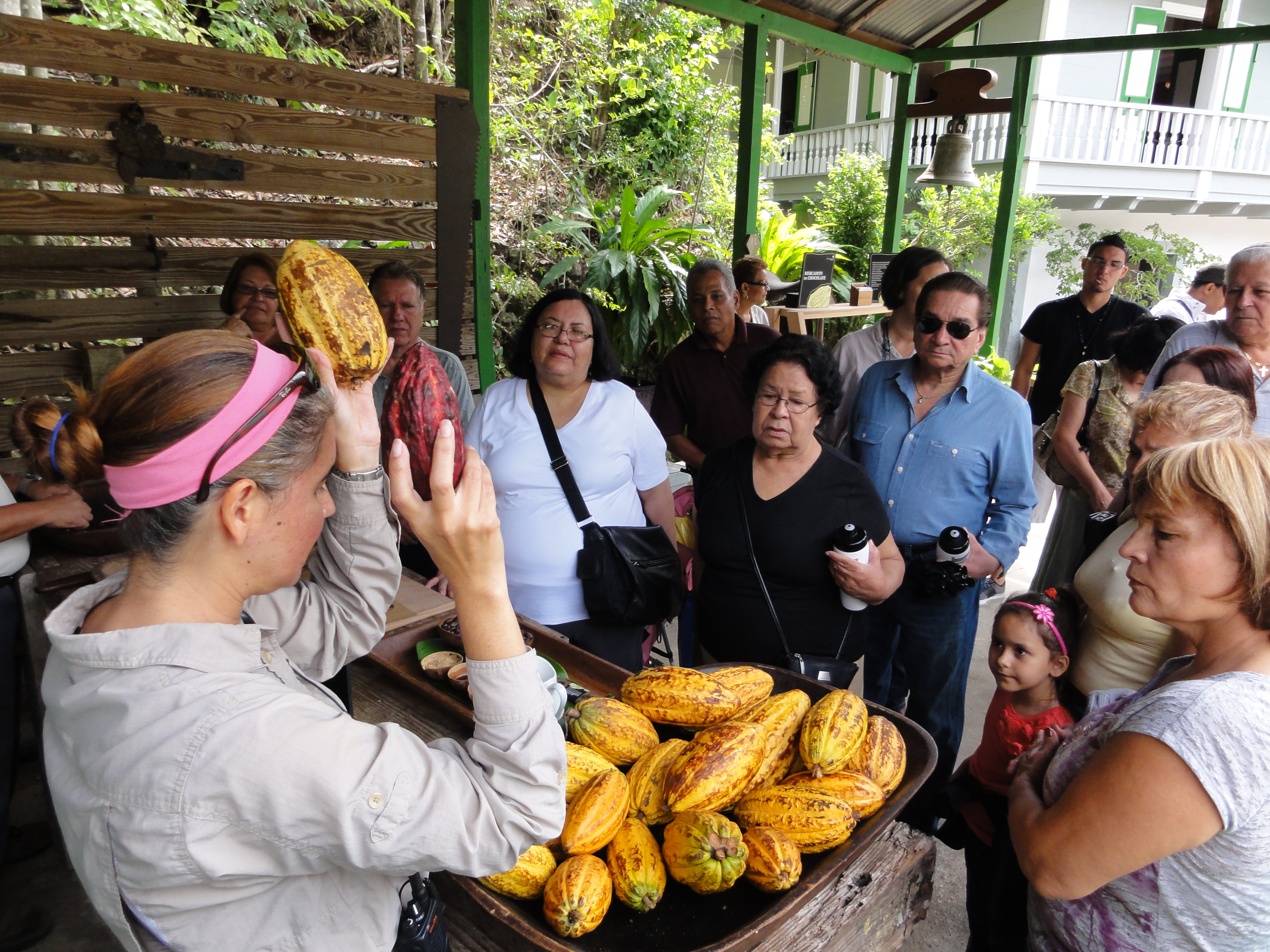
A group receiving a tour at Museo Hacienda Buena Vista

The plantation was started by Don Salvador de Vives in 1833. The plantation house (the "Manor House") was built in the Spanish Colonial style, with the surrounding buildings being built in the local criollo style. De Vives set up the farm to sell its produce in the Ponce market and in the sugarcane estates along the southern coast. Originally, the Vives estate covered 500 acres (2.0 km^{2}).

In 1845, the son of Don Salvador added a corn mill operation to the profitable fruit and vegetable production. Later, Don Salvador's grandson oversaw the addition of coffee growing and processing to the plantains and cornmeal, taking advantage of the great coffee-growing boom of the 1880s and 1890s. Don Salvador's son as well as his grandson introduced some of the most innovative farm machinery on the island, powered by a nearby 100-foot (30 m) waterfall. Eventually Hacienda Buena Vista would become one of the most successful plantations in the mountains of Puerto Rico.

By 1900, a series of turn-of-the-20th-century hurricanes and the failing coffee market, brought operations at the Hacienda to a standstill and gradually Hacienda Buena Vista fell into disrepair and was partially abandoned. By 1937 agriculture had seriously declined in Puerto Rico, and the plantation business was abandoned, becoming mostly a weekend country house for the Vives heirs. Worker barracks, outbuildings and equipment deteriorated rapidly under the humid tropical climate and rainfall.

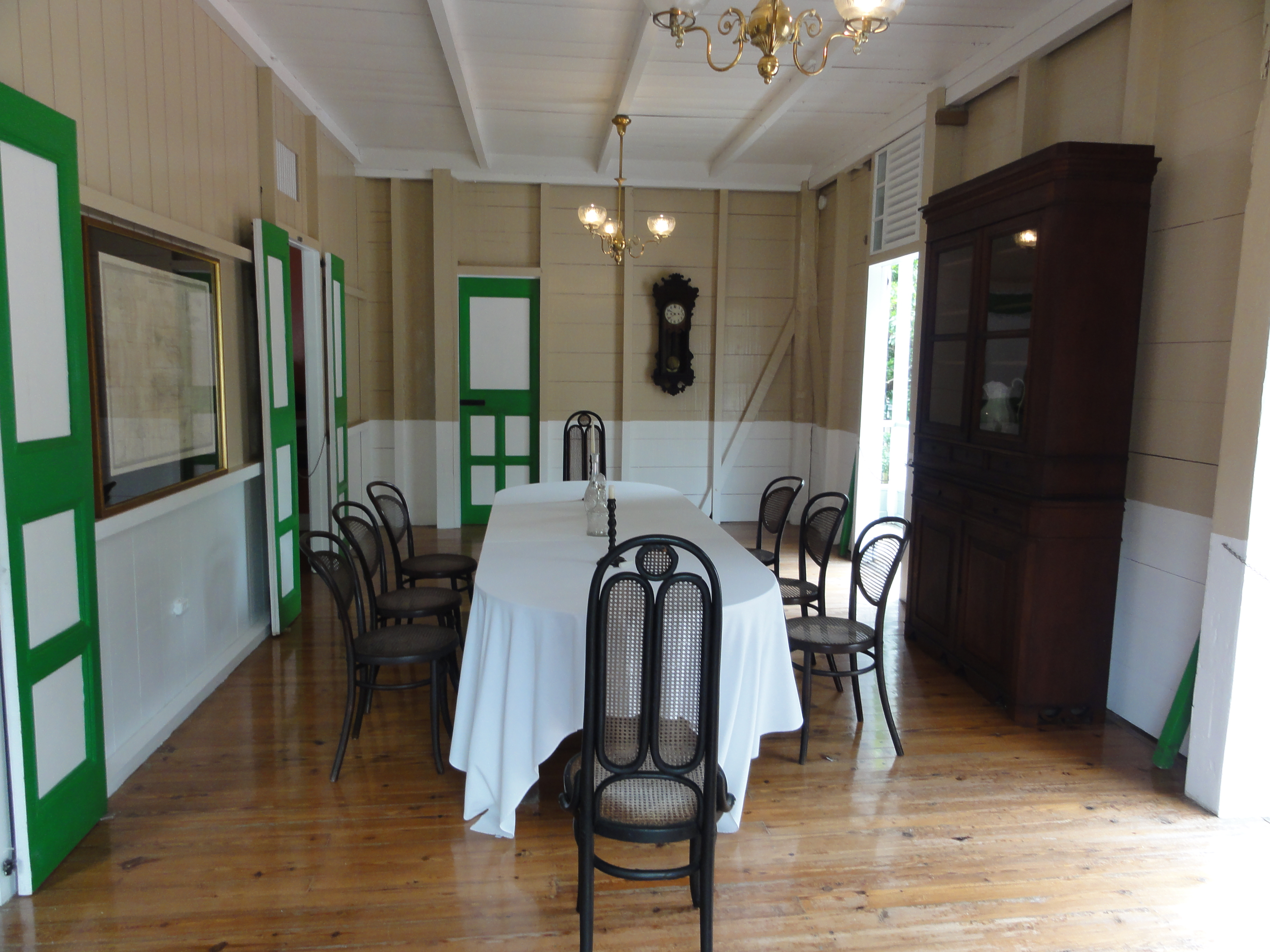
Inside the Manor House

As a result of a new law passed by the Legislature of Puerto Rico in 1956 intended to provide land to local farmers, the government of Puerto Rico expropriated most of the lands of Hacienda Buena Vista. Only 87 acres of land remained with the Vives, including the manor house and the water channel system.

These remaining 87 acres of lands were acquired by the Conservation Trust of Puerto Rico in 1984, with the intention of restoring the hacienda. Despite the grave deterioration of the coffee-processing machinery and the farm buildings, the Conservation Trust managed to restore the estate so that it could be used to educate the public about the golden era of fine coffee growing in the mountains of Puerto Rico. The original owners donated many of the furnishings, and the Conservation Trust purchased other authentic pieces.

In 1986, the Trust had completed the restoration and turned it into a museum. The museum opened in 1987 and has operated uninterrupted since. It is the only such museum in Puerto Rico. In 1988, the Trust also entirely reconstructed the coffee mill to its 1892 look. And, while the Vives family had rebuilt their coffee mill after 1928, the Trust chose to reconstruct an approximation of the earlier coffee mill of 1892.

== Significance ==
The Museum is significant for various reasons. First, it contains the only remaining example of the Barker hydraulic turbine, which was the first reaction type turbine ever made. It was nominated as a Mechanical Engineering landmark by the American Society of Mechanical Engineers in July 1994.

The second reason the Museum is significant is that it offers one of the best remaining examples of a Puerto Rican coffee plantation. This is important because in the latter part of the nineteenth century the coffee produced in Puerto Rico and exported to Europe and the United States was considered among the finest in the world. It is said to have even been the favorite at the Vatican at the time. Hacienda Buena Vista is also significant because it shows the evolution of the coffee industry in the region. Various periods can be appreciated. These range from the cultivation of produce such as plantains (1833–1845); to the production of flour (from rice and corn) (1847–1872). These products were staples for the subsistence of the local population.

== Description of the museum ==
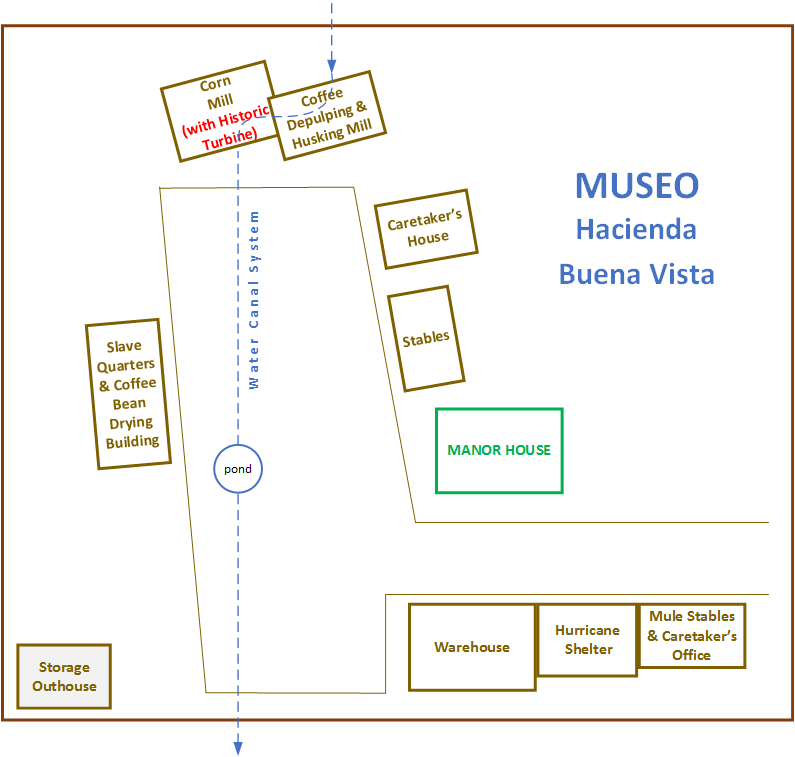
Sketch of Museo Hacienda Buena Vista

Museo Hacienda Buena Vista is both, and open-air museum and an indoors museum. The Museum is located in Barrio Magueyes, in the municipality of Ponce, Puerto Rico. Located at an altitude of between 160 and 460 meters above sea level, the air is crispy cool at night and moist-to-humid during the day. The hills near the hacienda-museum are excellent for cultivating corn, coffee, and fruits.

This open-air museum is made up of an 87-acre (350,000 m^{2}) agricultural complex. Its main buildings are grouped together in a 3-acre (12,000 m^{2}) central area and the property includes 11 original buildings: the hacienda manor house, the carriage house, the horse stables, the mule stables, the caretaker's house and office, two warehouses, a hurricane shelter, the corn mill, and the slave quarters. There is a water canal system that is still operative, an aqueduct, and a house garden. The coffee bean processing building was rebuilt to look like the original 1892 building.

=== Manor House and related structures ===
The manor house is a 2-story 60x50ft building built in 1845, the main indoors attraction of the museum and the reference point for all other structures. The ground floor was designed to be used for storage. The second floor contains three bedrooms and a living room. The eastern half of the manor house is made of brick and includes a courtyard, the kitchen, two more bedrooms and a bathroom. The manor house also has garden surrounded by a wrought iron-and-brick fence. The garden served two purposes: "Historically, this garden served as the formal entrance to the hacienda complex; however, it was most often used as a private family place." The carriage house, stables, and a small caretaker's house are nearby. In addition mule stables and caretaker's office are also part of the museum patrons can access. Located opposite the manor house, is the hurricane shelter. It is a solid brick structure measuring 15 ft (4.6 m). x 25 ft (7.6 m), and built 3 ft (0.91 m). above ground. Its walls, floor and ceiling were made to withstand or dissipate the destructive tropical storms that are common in this region.

=== Canal and aqueduct ===
A main attraction of the museum is the brick-and-mortar canal which is 18 inches deep by 12 inches wide, and is some 2,600 feet (790 m) long. A water drop height of 360 meters provides the energy needed to run the mills in the hacienda. The canal and aqueduct were finished in 1851. A series of manifolds are used for diverting the water according to the needs of the hacienda agricultural production: one gate diverts water to the water wheel and the corn mill water turbine, another gate diverts water to the fermentation tank, the ornamental washbasin, and the bath, and a third gate diverts water to a race which sends water back to the Canas River.

=== Coffee de-pulping and husking mill ===
The coffee de-pulping and husking mill is a 2-story wooden building located to the northwest of the museum's manor house. It originally housed the 1845 corn mill but in 1892, the structure was modified to become the coffee husking mill.

=== Corn mill and bean drying station ===
A second corn mill at the Hacienda Buena Vista Museum was built in 1854. It is a two-story wood-frame structure measuring 16 ft (4.9 m). wide by 25 ft 4 in (7.72 m) long. The actual corn-milling work took place on the floor of this mill. Dried corn making it thru a hopper in this building was processed here. Grinding of the corn into corn meal occurred here. It was also packed into bags here. One of the canals of the aqueduct system ran underneath this building to power the corn mill above. A bean drying station is also part of the exhibits; this building dates from 1847. Thi building had previously served as slave quarters, but after the abolition of slavery in Puerto Rico in 1873, it was converted into a bean drying building. The pans used for drying the coffee beans were kept in this building as well.

== Legacy ==
On 16 July 1994, Robert B. Gaither of the American Society of Mechanical Engineers presented a plaque to the Puerto Rico Conservation Trust designating the Hacienda Buena Vista's hydraulic turbine as a National Historic Monument of Mechanical Engineering. The award was given in recognition not only of the value of the turbine but also of the extraordinary work the Conservation Trust carried in its restoration. A copy of the award is available for viewing at the museum's gift shop.

== Gallery ==
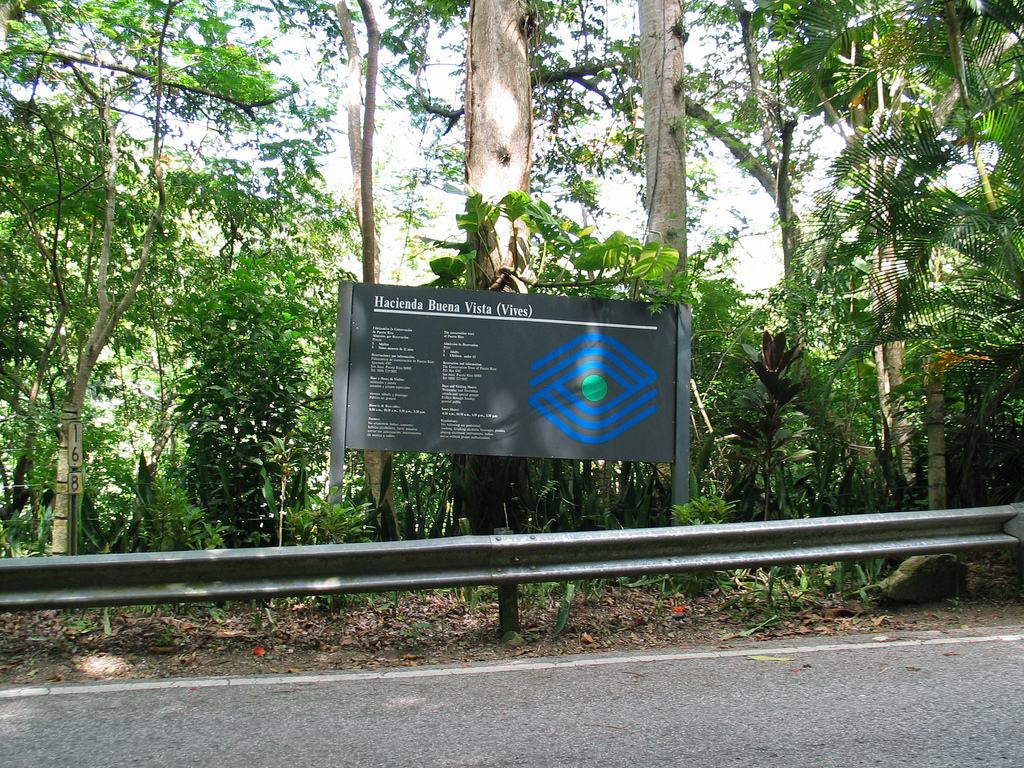
Sign on PR-123 marking the entrance to the Museum

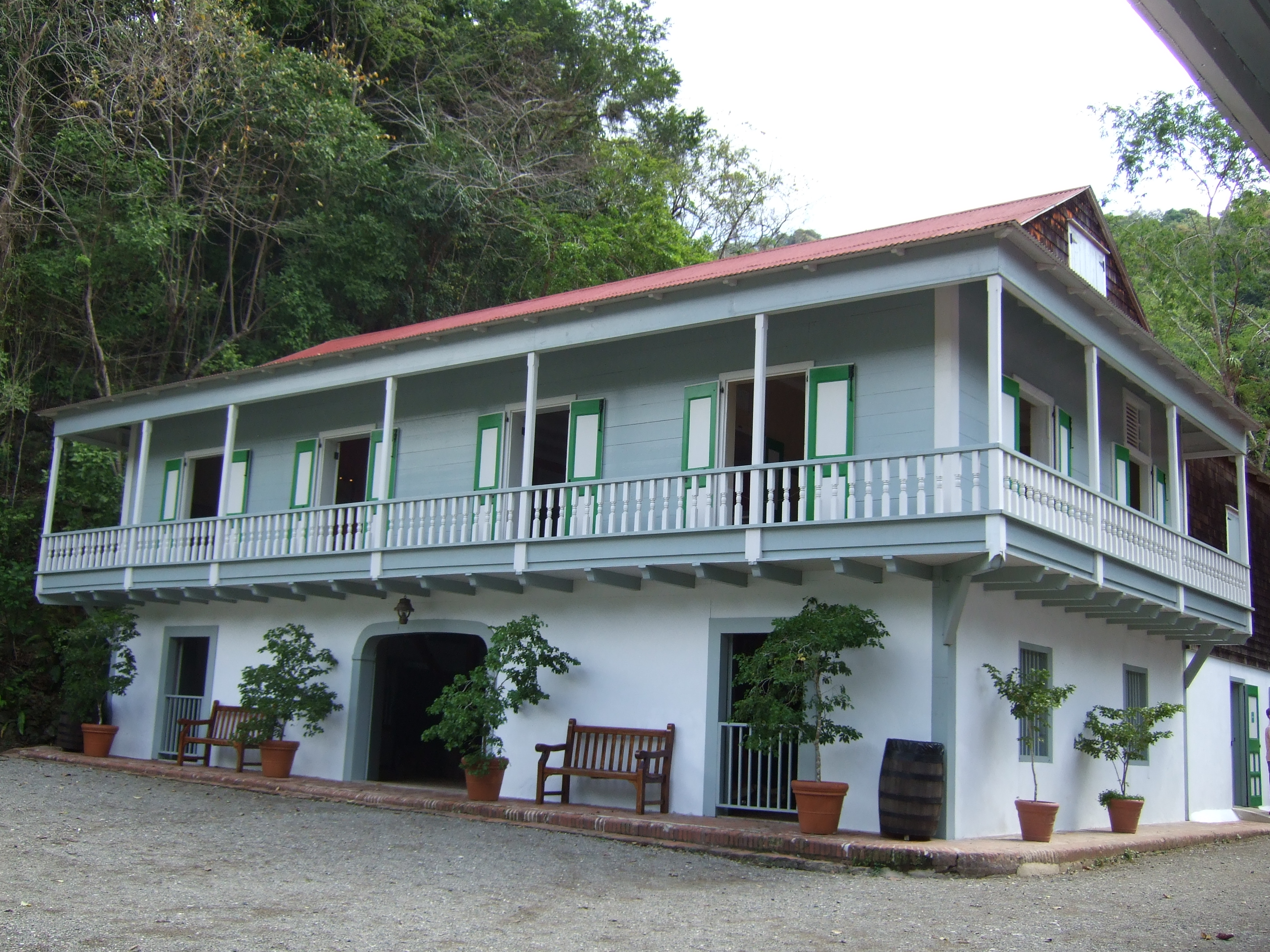
The Manor House at Museo Hacienda Buena Vista

== See also ==
- List of museums in Ponce, Puerto Rico
- Casa Vives
- Hacienda Lealtad
