= Hacienda Lealtad =

Coffee farm in La Torre, Lares, Puerto Rico

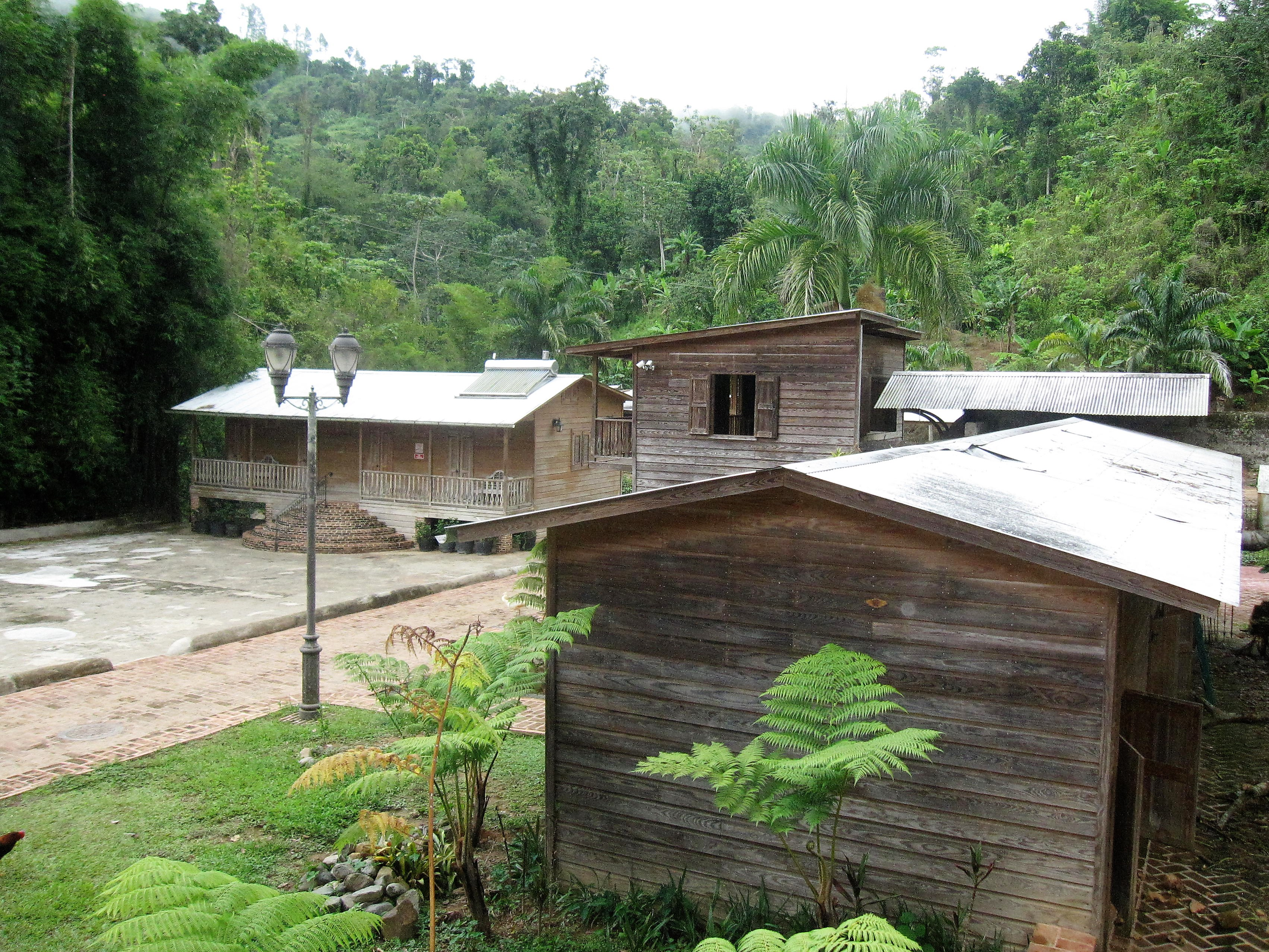
- Hacienda Lealtad renovated structures
- Interactive map of Hacienda Lealtad
- Town/City: La Torre, Lares, Puerto Rico
- Coordinates: 18°14′00″N 66°53′03″W
- Established: 1830
- Owner: Edwin Noel Soto Ruiz
- Area: 600 cuerdas (235.82 hectares (582.7 acres))
- Produces: Coffee
- Status: Operating as museum, hotel, agrotourism; open to the public, tours by reservation
- Website: haciendalealtad.net

Hacienda Lealtad (IPA: [ˌsjẽn̪.d̪a le.al̪ˈt̪að̞]; also known as Hacienda La Lealtad, (IPA: [aˌsjẽn̪.d̪a la le.al̪ˈt̪að̞]) and once known as Hacienda la Esperanza (IPA: [aˌsjẽn̪.d̪a la es.peˈɾãn.sa]) is a historic coffee plantation in barrio La Torre, Lares, Puerto Rico. A large hacienda, it was founded in 1830, by Juan Bautista Plumey, a French immigrant, who arrived in Puerto Rico with enslaved people. (Juan Bautista Plumey was born in France on September 8, 1797, and named Jean Baptiste Henri Plumey.)

It would become the largest coffee plantation in Lares, with over thirty enslaved people and hundreds of day laborers working the 69 cuerdas (27.12 hectares (67.0 acres)) of coffee farm. For many years the plantation was a large producer and exporter of coffee. Day laborers, jornaleros or braceros from Lares worked in the coffee fields of the hacienda. In 1880, it was owned by Miguel Marquez Enseñat.

It is owned by Edwin Soto and his family, who restored it and operate the hacienda as a hotel, coffee shop, venue for weddings and workshops, and a living museum. Coffee growing in Puerto Rico has seen a resurgence and Hacienda Lealtad produces coffee under the brand Café Lealtad. The Café Bistro Hacienda Lealtad on Puerto Rico Highway 128 kilometer 55.8, is where groups meet for the start of their tour of the 19th century coffee plantation.

== Brief history ==
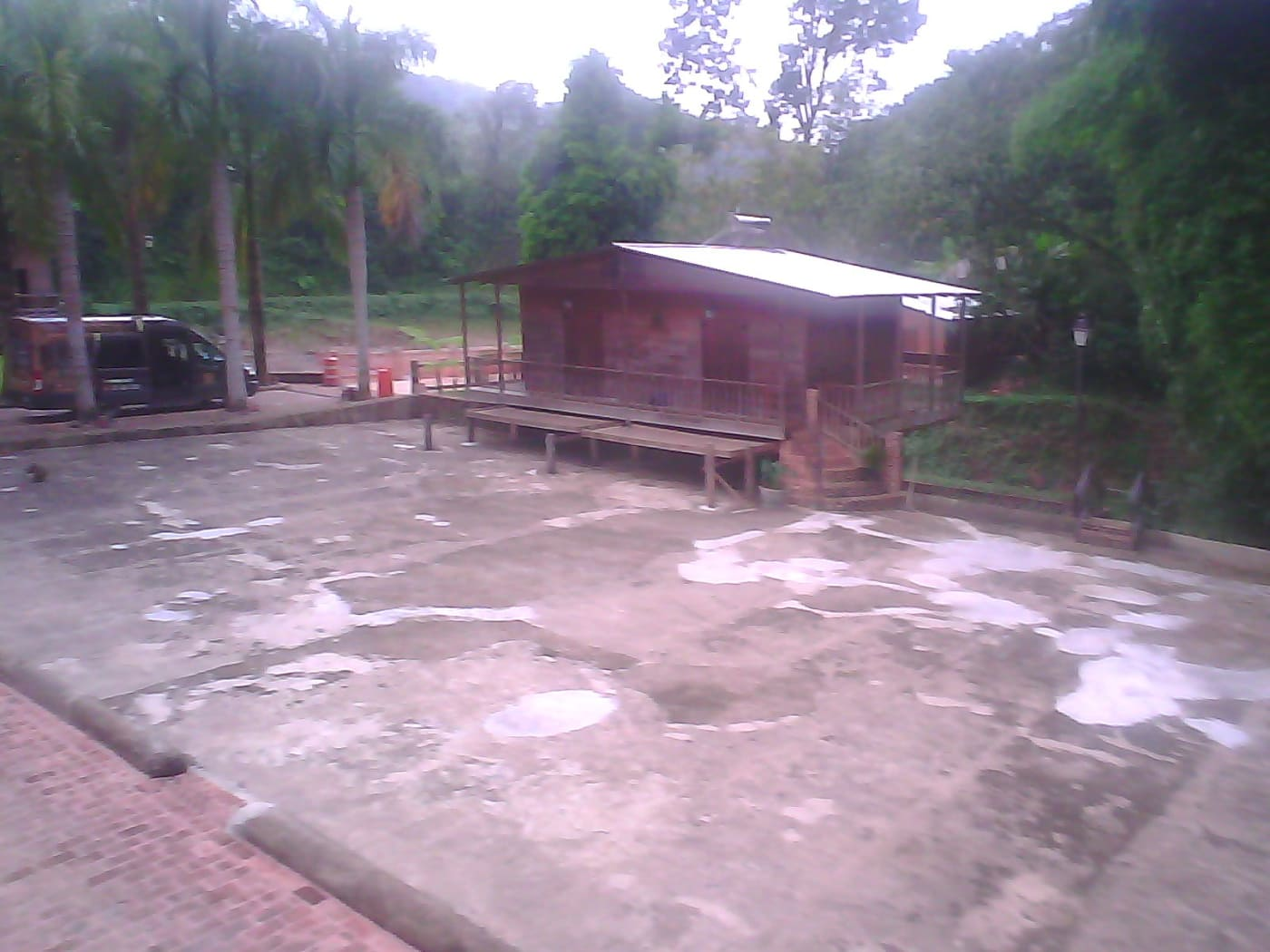
The "Glácil" is the area where 21 enslaved workers set the coffee out under the sun to dry.

Lares was founded on April 26, 1827, and became an important location of coffee production in Puerto Rico. In 1830, Juan Bautista Plumey established Hacienda Lealtad, the coffee producing farm. Plumey, a French immigrant had come to Lares with 32 slaves. On May 20, 1833, he married Petronila Irizarry from nearby San Sebastián, Puerto Rico (Pepino) and they had twelve children. José María Marxuach Echavarría, twice mayor of San Juan, married one of Juan Bautista Plumey daughters.

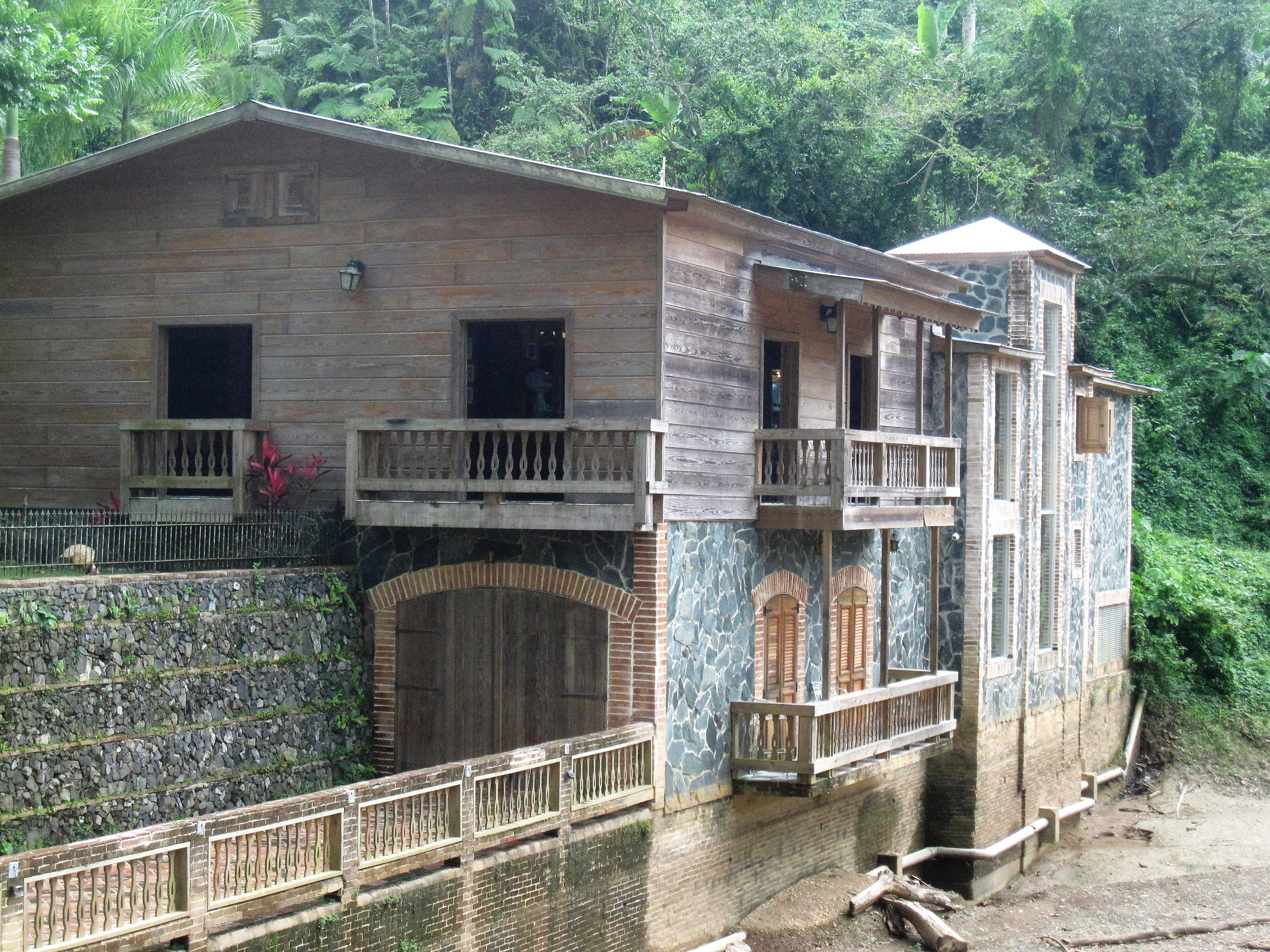
Hacienda Lealtad is in mountainous Lares, Puerto Rico.

After Plumey established Hacienda Lealtad, it became the largest and most modern of its time given it was the first to generate its own electricity to power the hacienda's machinery and mills. A canal and aqueduct guided water from the mountainside to a 17-foot (5.2 m) hydraulic wheel that generated power to the plantation.

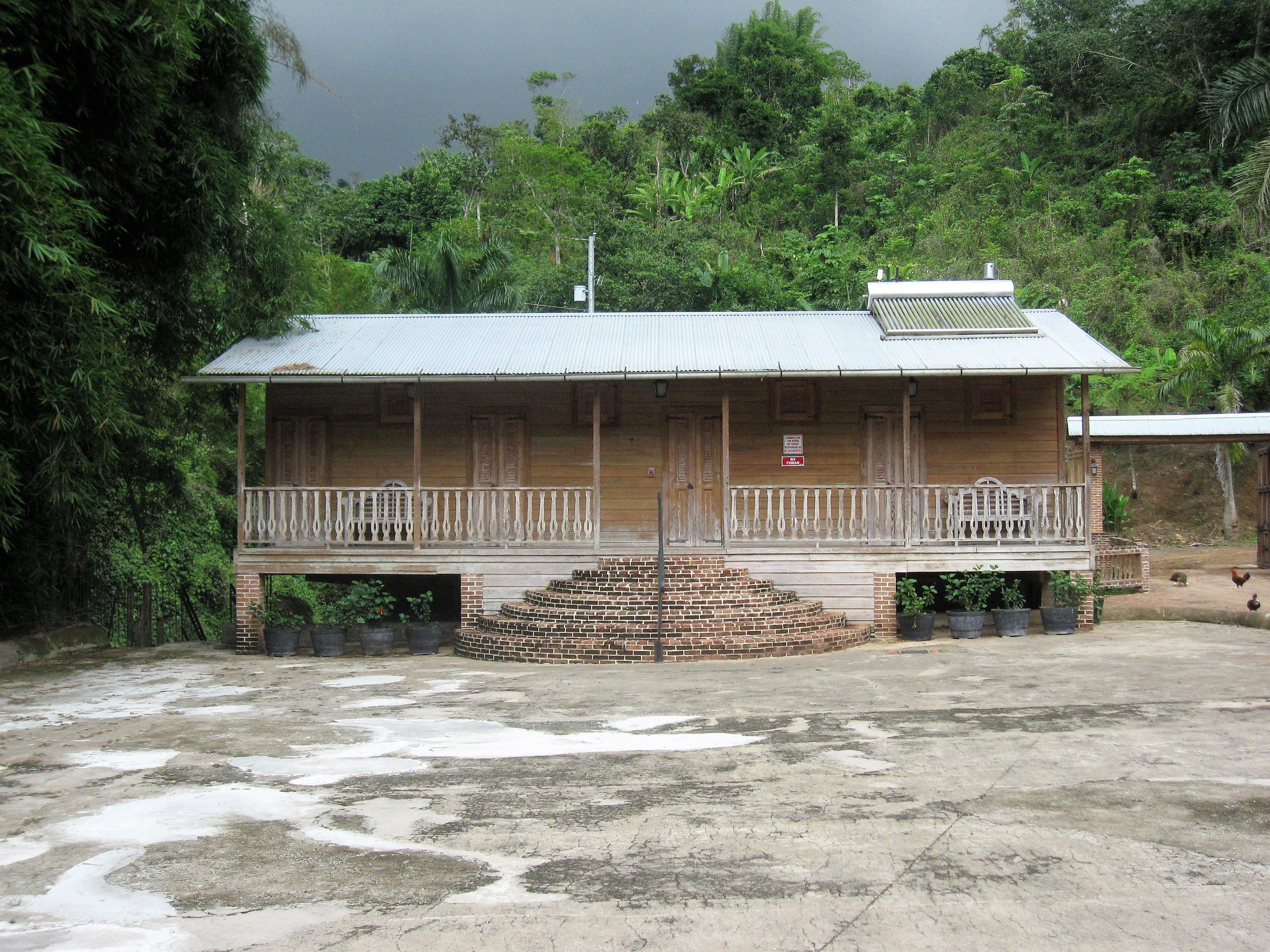
The enslaved people's sleeping quarters at Hacienda Lealtad have been renovated.

By 1846, Juan Bautista Plumey's hacienda which at the time was called Hacienda La Esperanza "was the only property registered as an hacienda in official documents. He had 69 cuerdas planted in coffee worked by 33 slaves." Plumey did not allow his workers to work on other farms.

In 1868, Lares was the site of Grito de Lares, a two-day revolt against the crown of Spain. While some documents state that people from Hacienda Lealtad participated in the revolt, a historian named Joseph Harrison Flores, with the National Archives of Puerto Rico, studied the history of the estate and Grito de Lares and stated that only an eight-year-old child of an enslaved person from Hacienda Lealtad was at the revolt, and spent 6 months in prison.

In 1873, slavery was abolished and, "by the 1880s coffee had replaced sugar as Puerto Rico's leading export staple and principal source of wealth."

In 1880, when it was called Hacienda Paraiso, it was owned by Miguel Marquez Enseñat who paid workers with hacienda token money, which could only be used to purchase goods from a store at the hacienda itself.

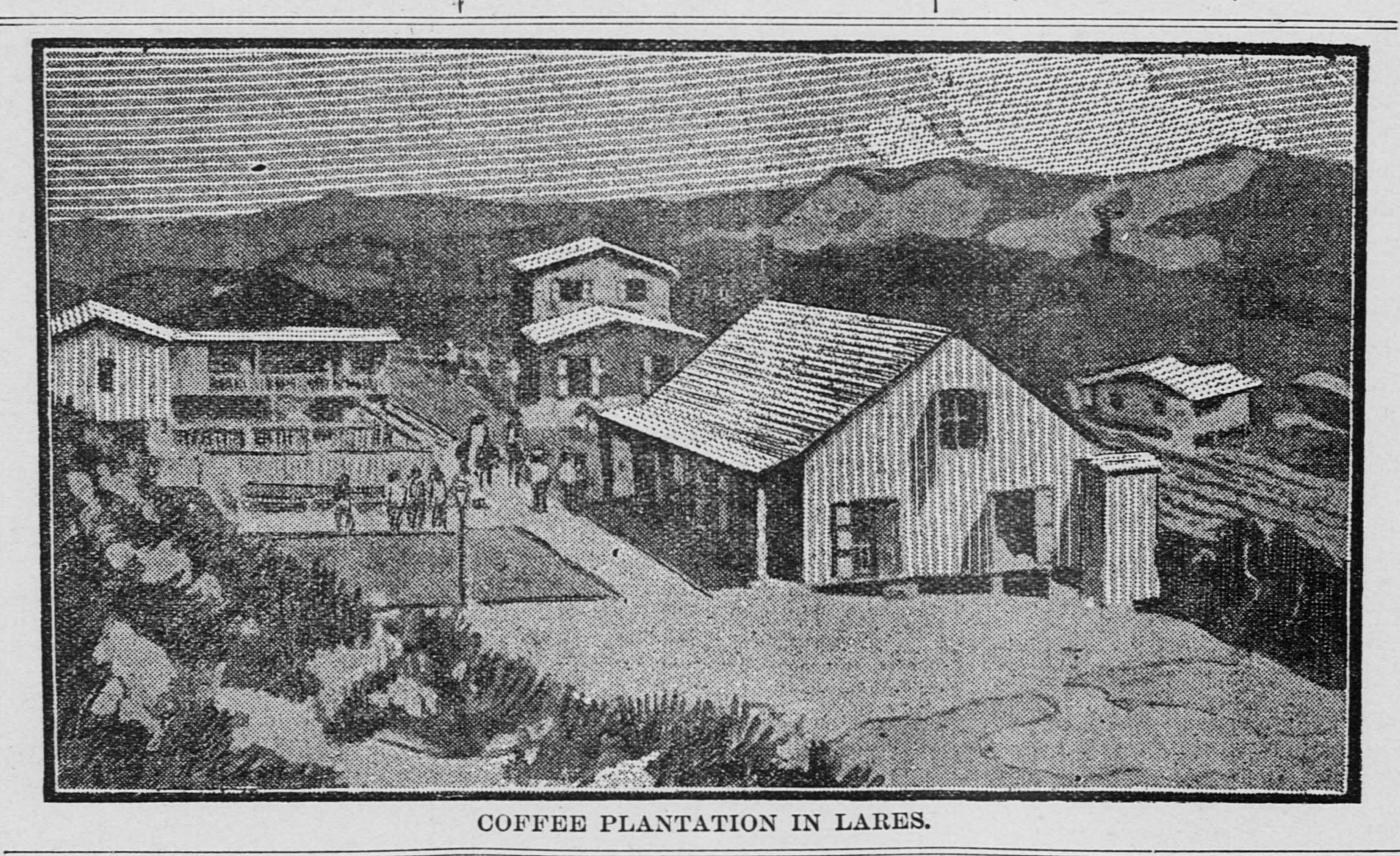
Drawing of a coffee farm in Lares depicted in a newspaper article titled "Porto Rican wealth" on June 8, 1901

Coffee production and exportation dropped considerably after Puerto Rico was acquired by the United States with the 1898 Treaty of Paris, and eventually, the plantation fell into disuse and decline. However, the place had sentimental value to Edwin Soto, a Puerto Rican businessman from Lares, because he had picked ripe coffee beans there as a child. Soto purchased the hacienda as a second home. While Soto's initial intentions for the property, when he purchased it in 2007, were to keep it as a second home he later decided to restore it for its historic importance. Soto invested millions of dollars into its restoration and Hacienda Lealtad is now a living museum, a hotel, coffee shop, offering educational tours to local and international tourists. It also serves as a place for people in the agriculture and coffee industry to meet and hold workshops.

In 2014, the Puerto Rico Department of Agriculture began an initiative to develop agricultural tourism and in 2016, Hacienda Lealtad was endorsed by the Puerto Rico Tourism Company (Compañia de Turismo de Puerto Rico). Since the start of its restoration Café Lealtad, Inc., as the company is called, has purchased coffee seeds and other equipment and services from the Puerto Rico Department of Agriculture.

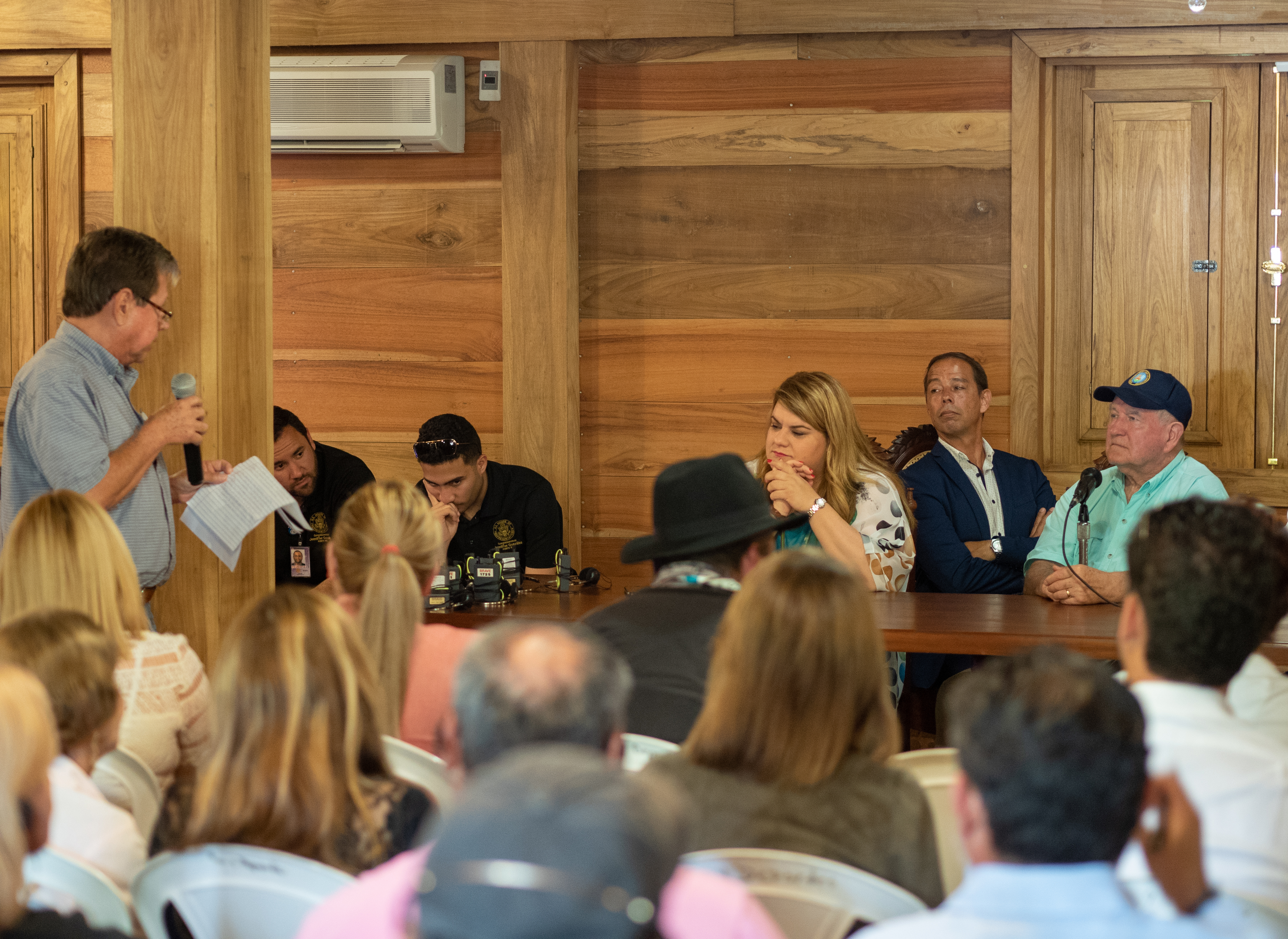
Agriculture Secretary Sonny Perdue held a town hall meeting in Hacienda Lealtad with Jenniffer González, farmers and other stakeholders after Hurricane María.

Students of agriculture and members of agricultural associations visit Hacienda Lealtad in groups for workshops and as Puerto Rico continues to strengthen its agricultural industry, thirty Puerto Rican farmers completed an intensive, eight-week course on the business side of agriculture, at the hacienda. The University of Puerto Rico at Mayagüez opened an Hacienda Lealtad Café in early 2019.

Tours were underway regularly until Hurricane Maria hit on September 20, 2017. A week after a relieved Soto reported that Hurricane Irma had not caused much damage to the coffee trees on his estate, Hurricane Maria hit and destroyed all the coffee trees, around 60,000. Clean-up, restoration and planting began anew soon afterwards and tours and functions at the hacienda resumed.

A few months after Hurricane Maria struck, a meeting was held by the Secretary of Agriculture, farmers and stakeholders at Hacienda Lealtad.

== Attractions ==
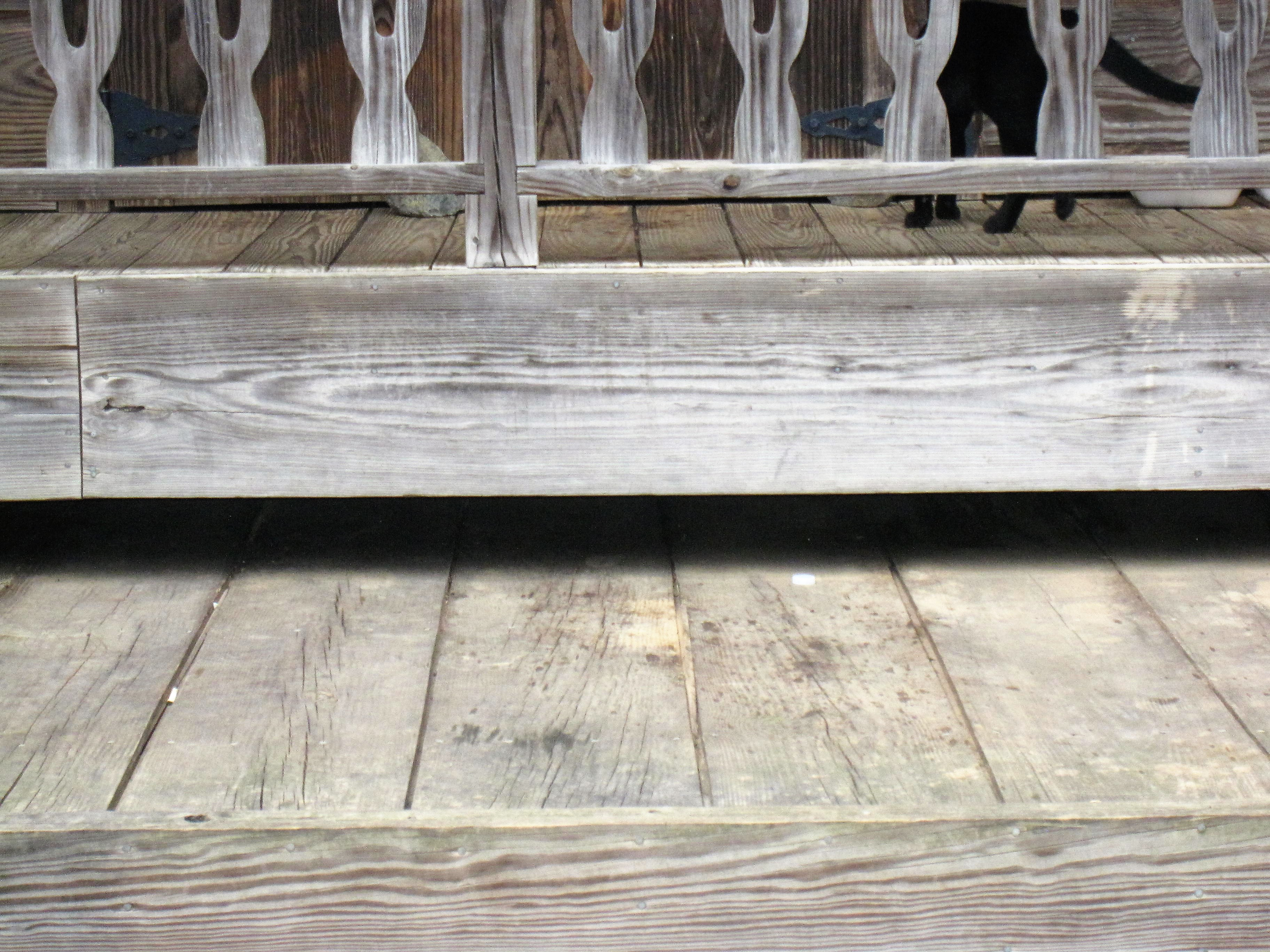
Corredoras (large drawers) were used to slide and protect the coffee beans from rain.

The 19th century, coffee farming culture of Puerto Rico where jornaleros and enslaved people processed coffee for its distribution to Europe, is on display at Hacienda Lealtad. Educational tours where people can learn about coffee cultivation are available, by reservation, and the main attractions are:

- a former post office
- the landowner's house
- a coffee drying field (glácil) and drawers (corredoras) for protecting coffee beans from rain
- a mill to process the beans
- a prison cell made of stone which was used for imprisoning enslaved people
- coffee trees
- a museum with furniture belonging to family of José de Diego, a Puerto Rican poet
- Café Lealtad coffee
- a nearby creek
- quarters for enslaved people who worked there, the kitchen has a wood-burning stove

== Coffee growing ==
There's been a resurgence in coffee growing in Puerto Rico, despite the lack of manpower and other challenges facing coffee farm landowners. Hacienda Lealtad in Lares has a coffee shop called Café Bistro Hacienda Lealtad. Café Lareño Coffee Shop is nearby and other such chic coffee shops have opened up along the mountainous hilltops of Lares and other municipalities in Puerto Rico. Lares has been the Puerto Rican municipality with the largest emigration to the mainland United States, since being hit by a severe economic recession.

== In media and popular culture ==
The dress worn by Keysi Vargas, Puerto Rican contestant in the 2015 Miss World Beauty pageant, represented the Hacienda Lealtad Coffee brand.

In 2015, a made-for-television movie, La Cenicienta Boricua (Puerto Rican Cinderella) was filmed at Hacienda Lealtad and released on Telemundo.

== Gallery ==
Scenes around Hacienda Lealtad:

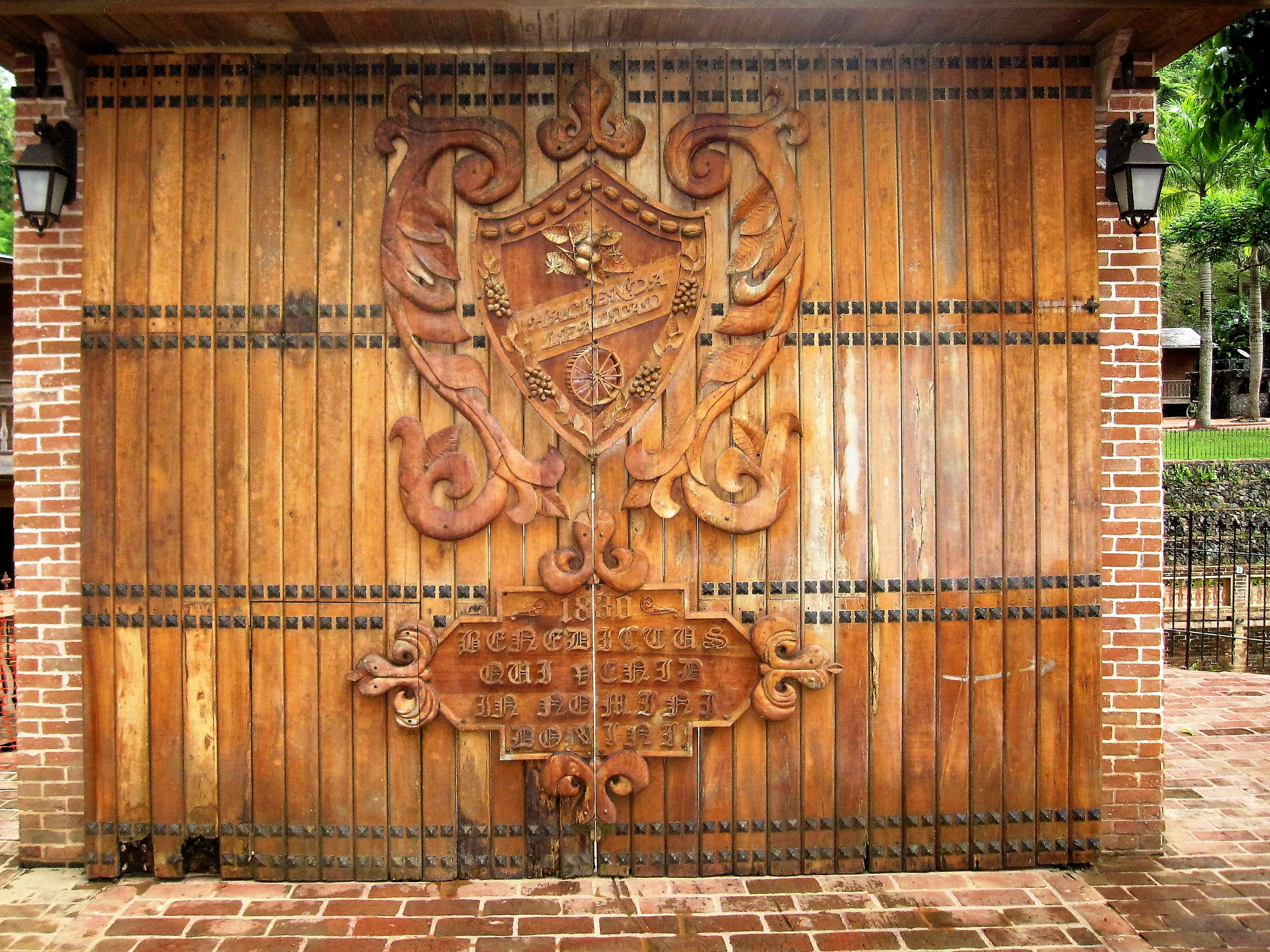
Main door to Hacienda Lealtad, marked with 1830

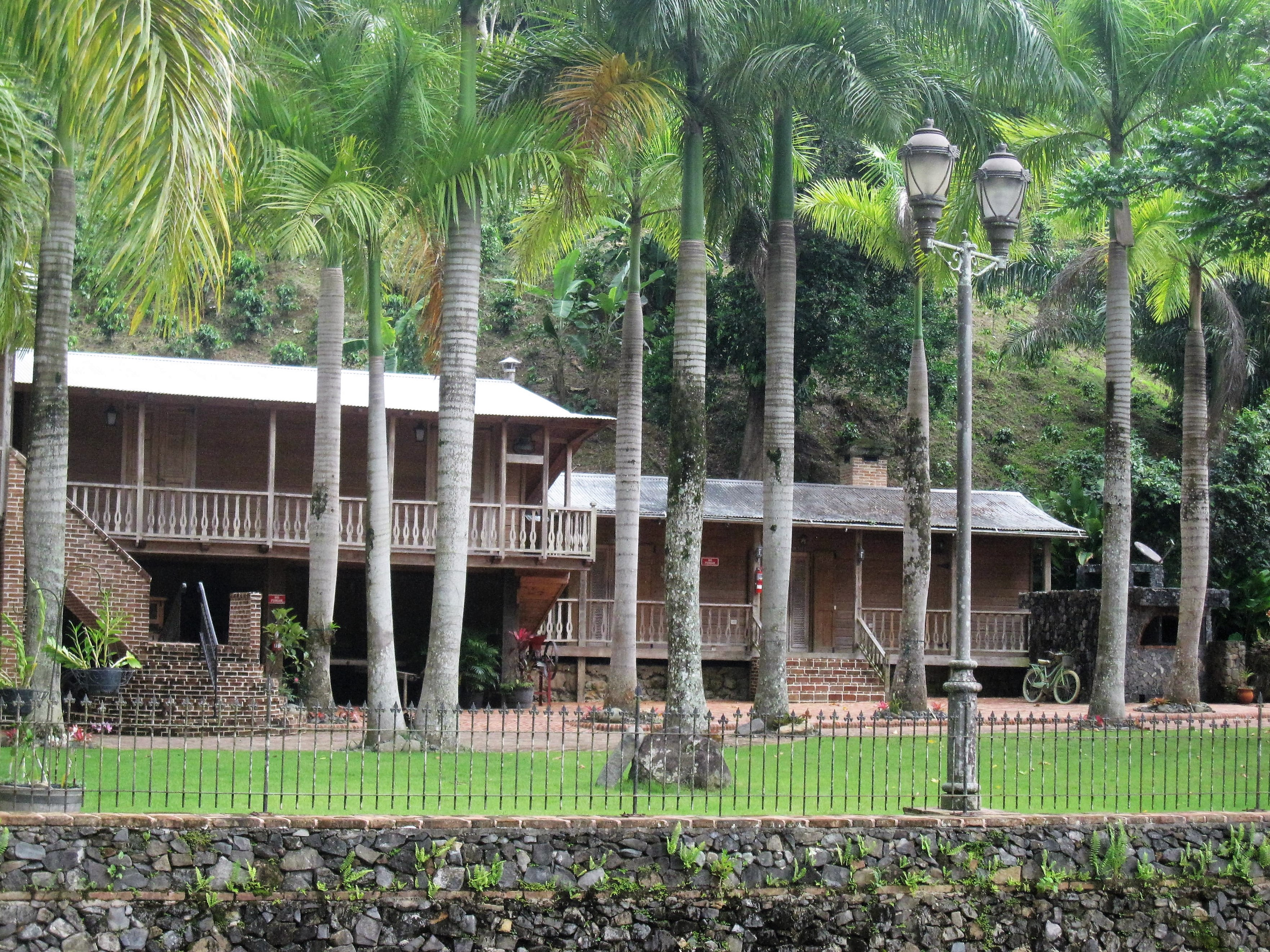
Hacienda Lealtad

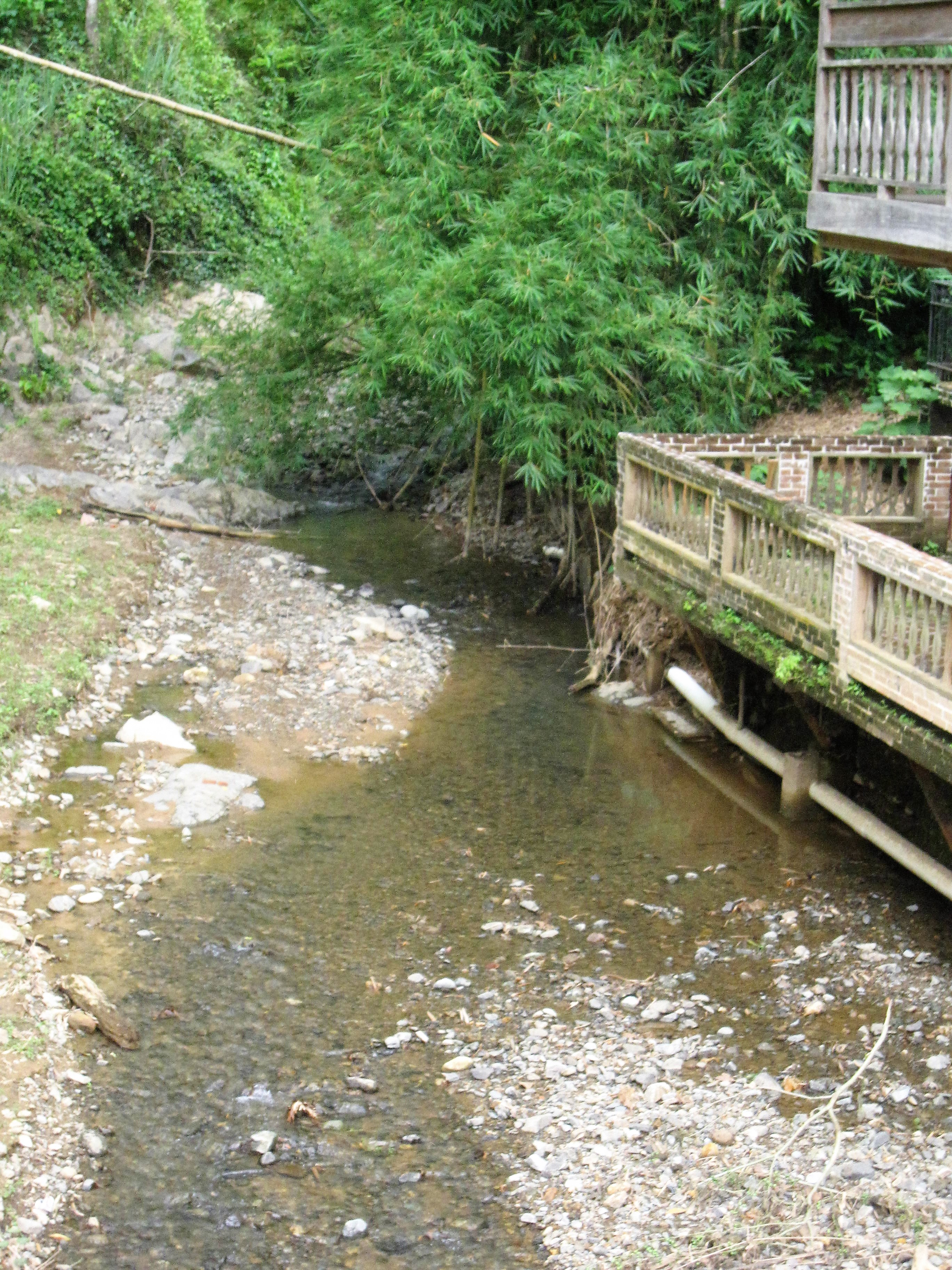
Quebrada de Platanos, a stream

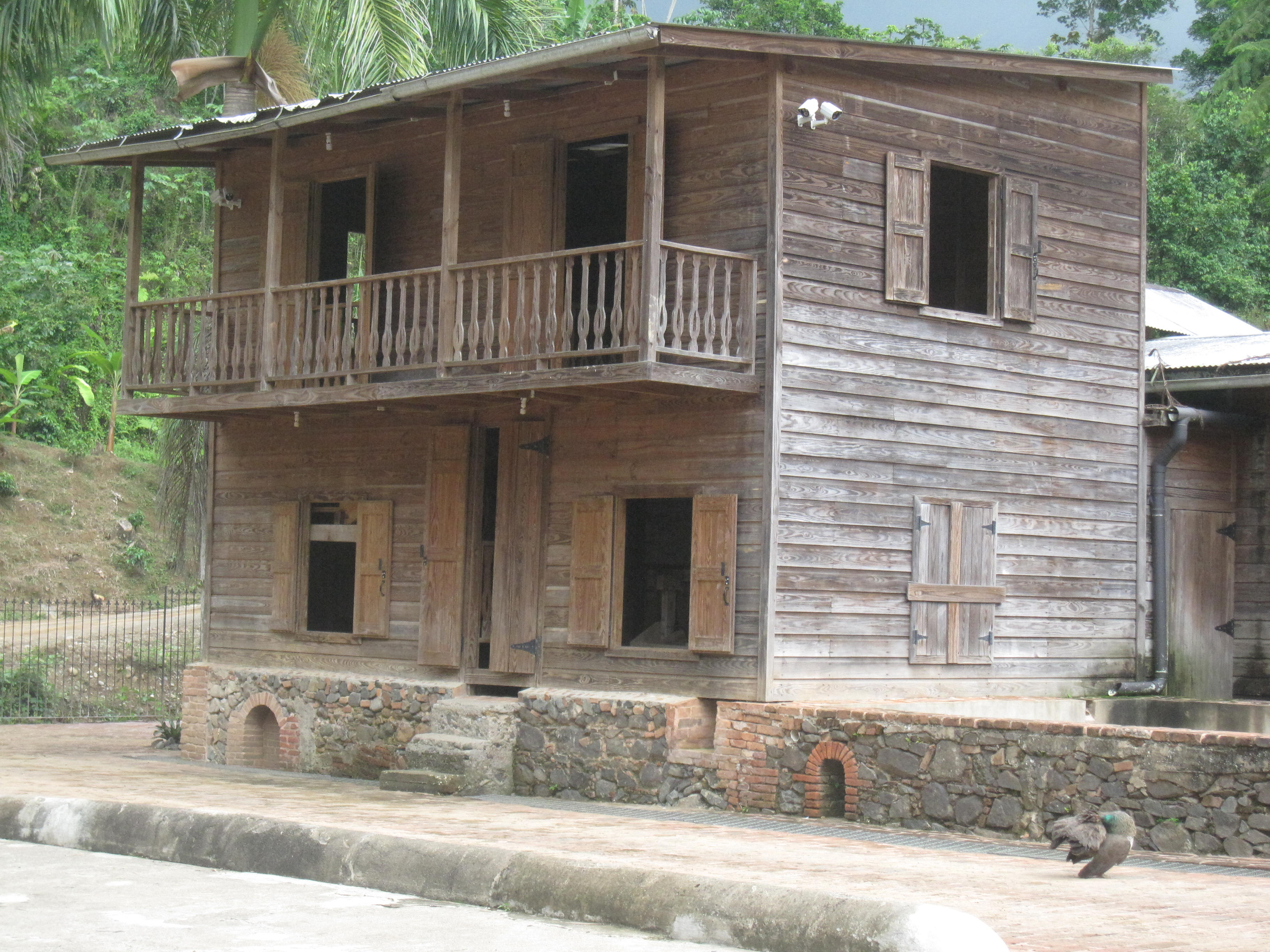
Hacienda Lealtad

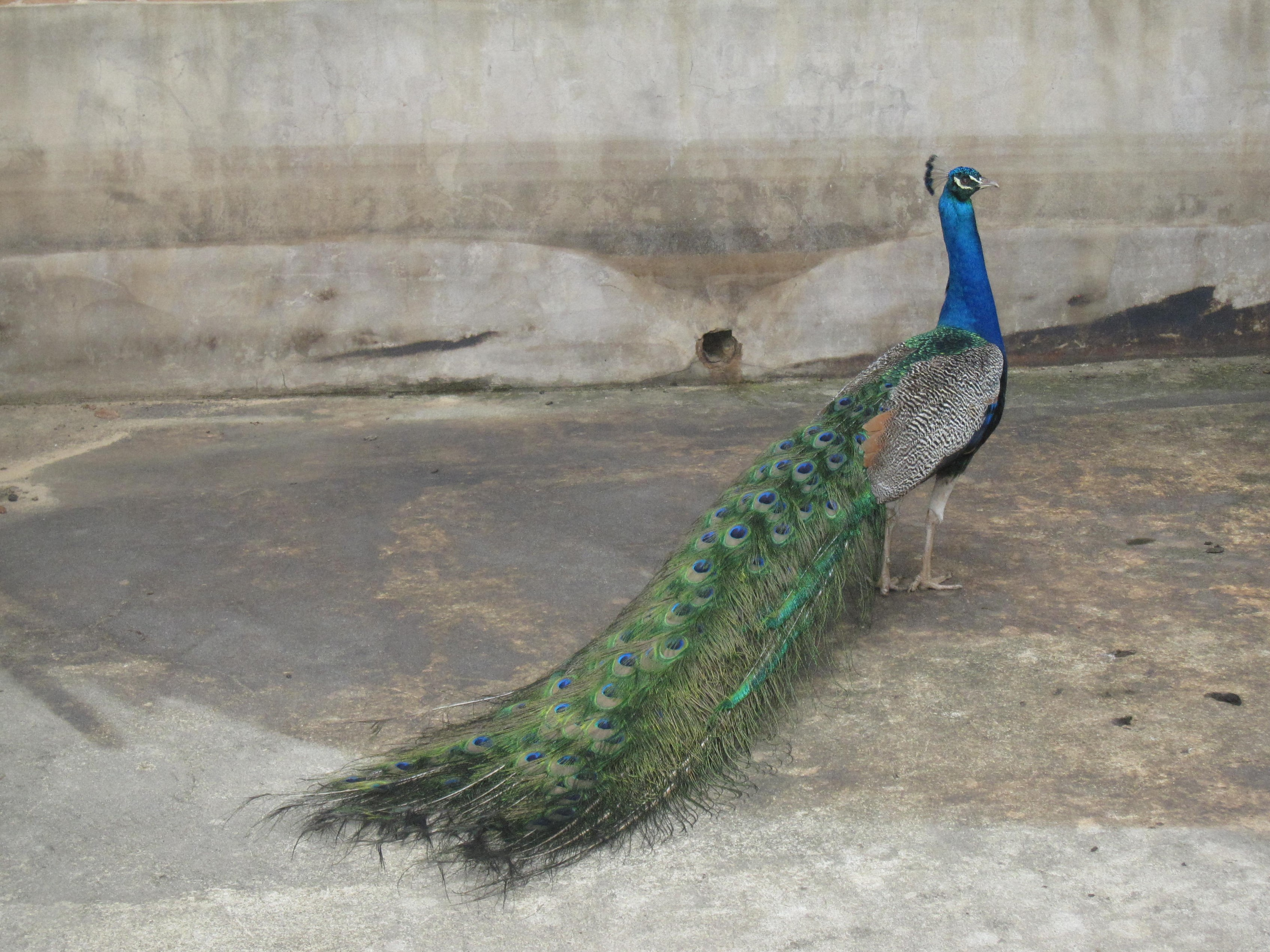
Peacock

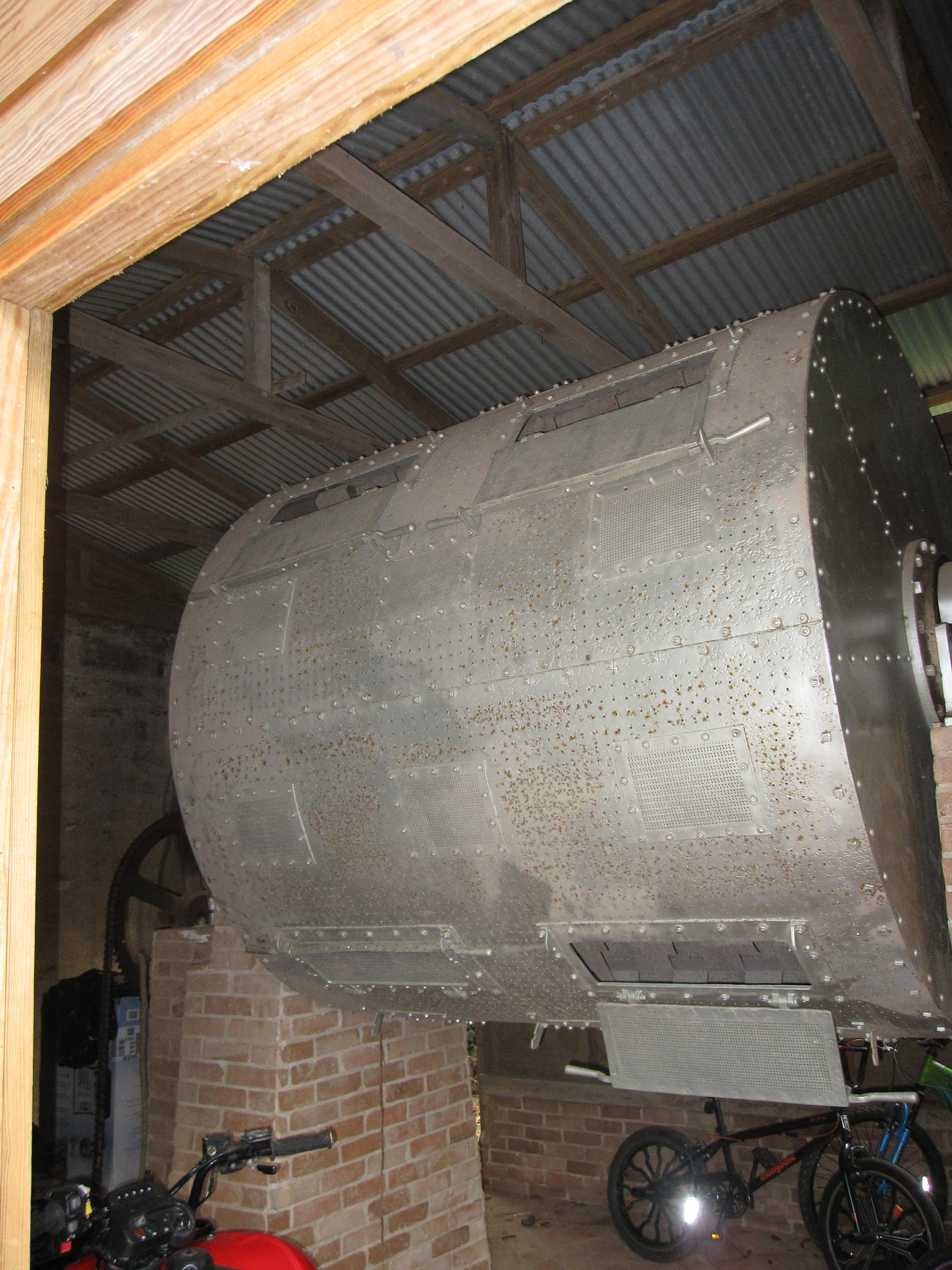
Coffee de-pulper

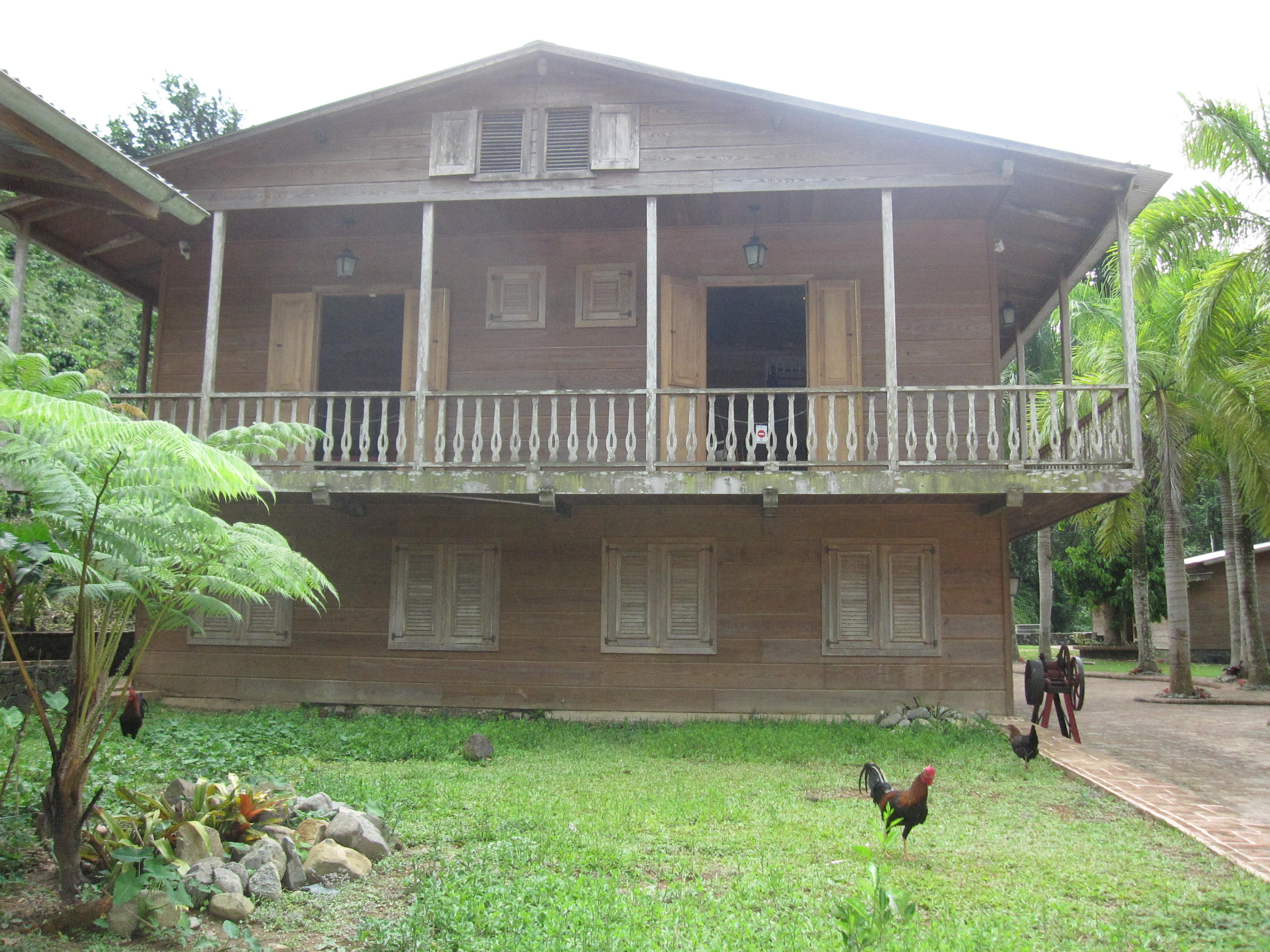
Hacienda Lealtad

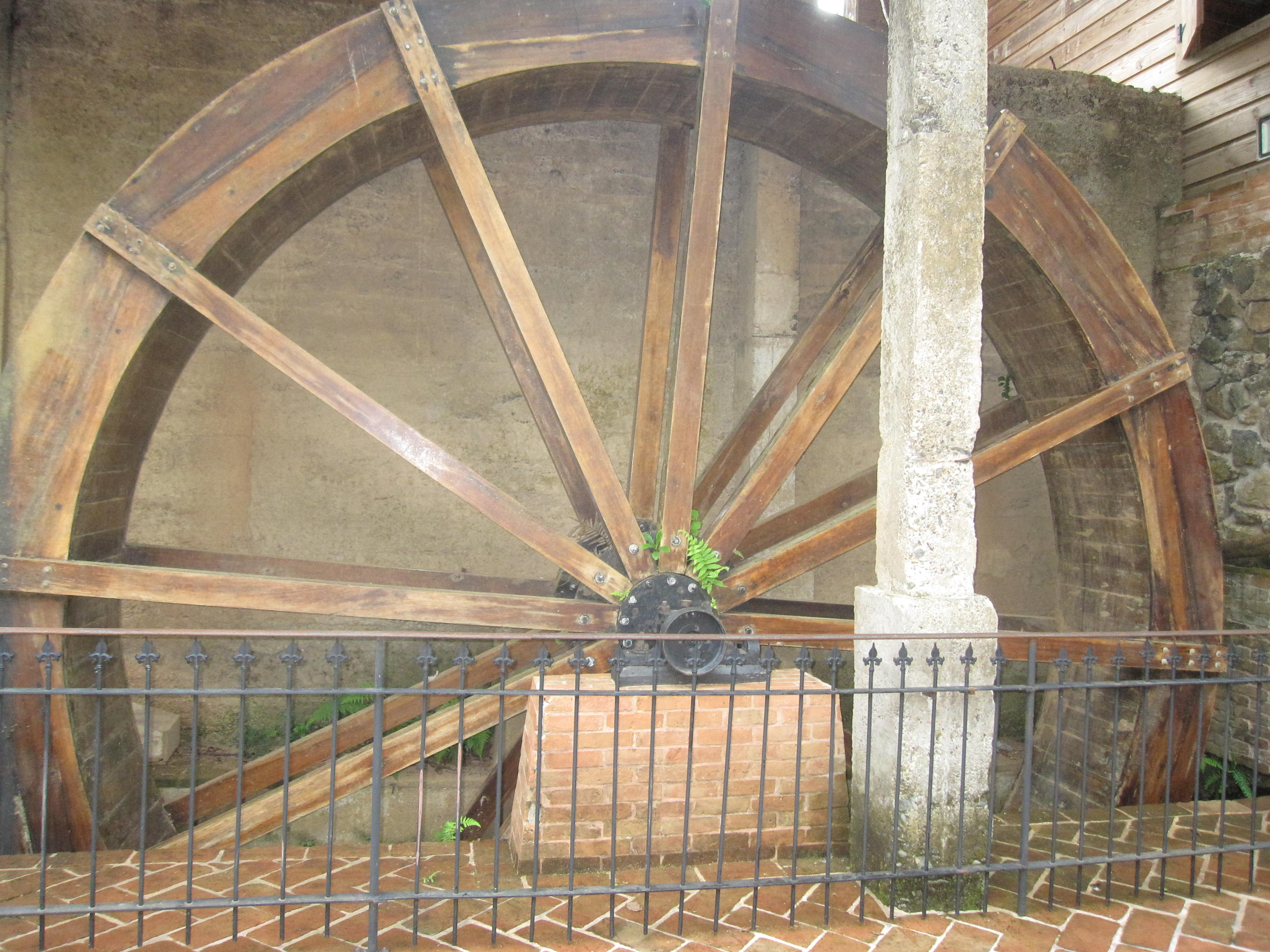
The hydraulic wheel which generated electricity for the plantation in 1830 is operational.

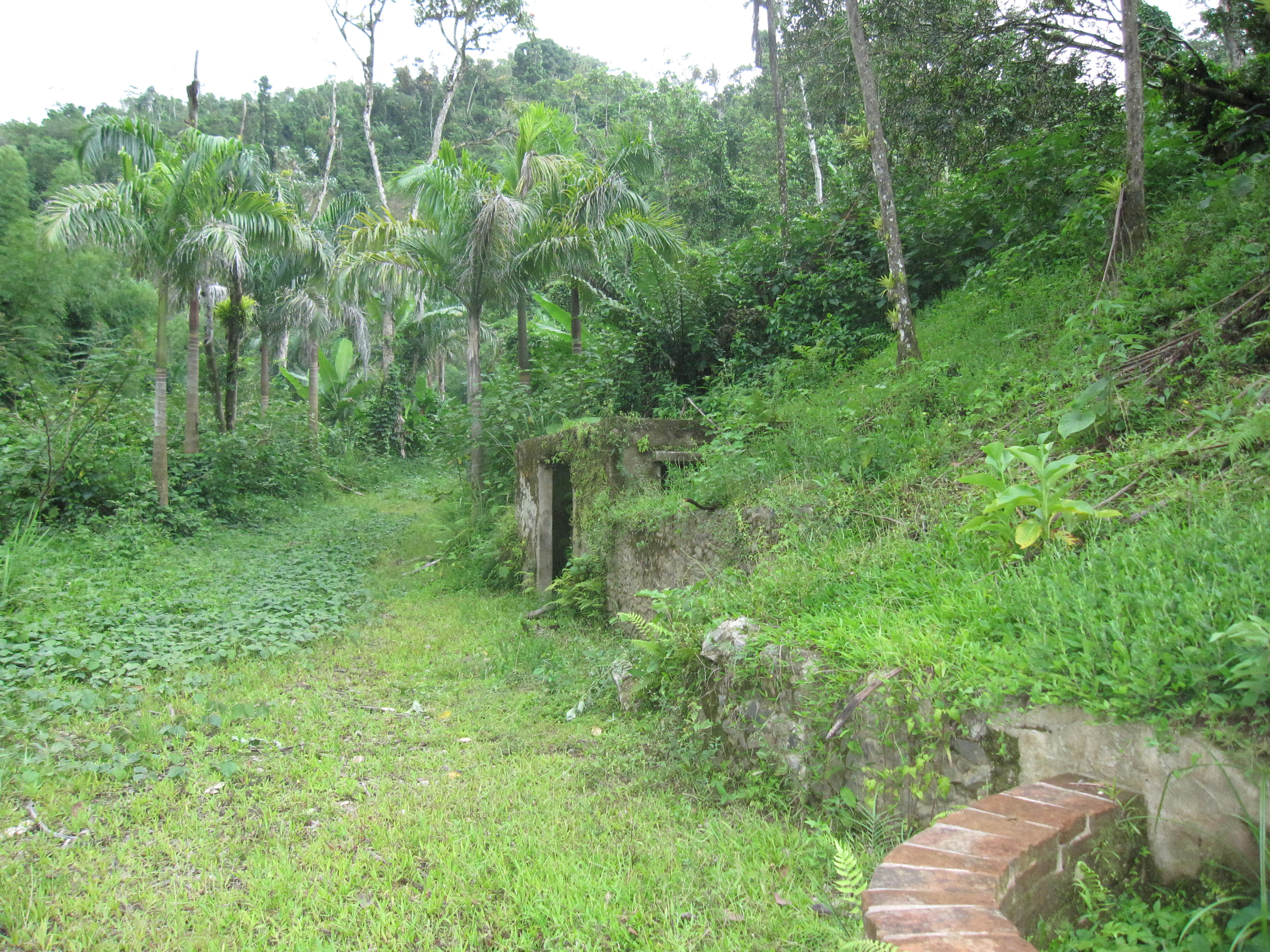
This is where enslaved workers were locked for punishment.

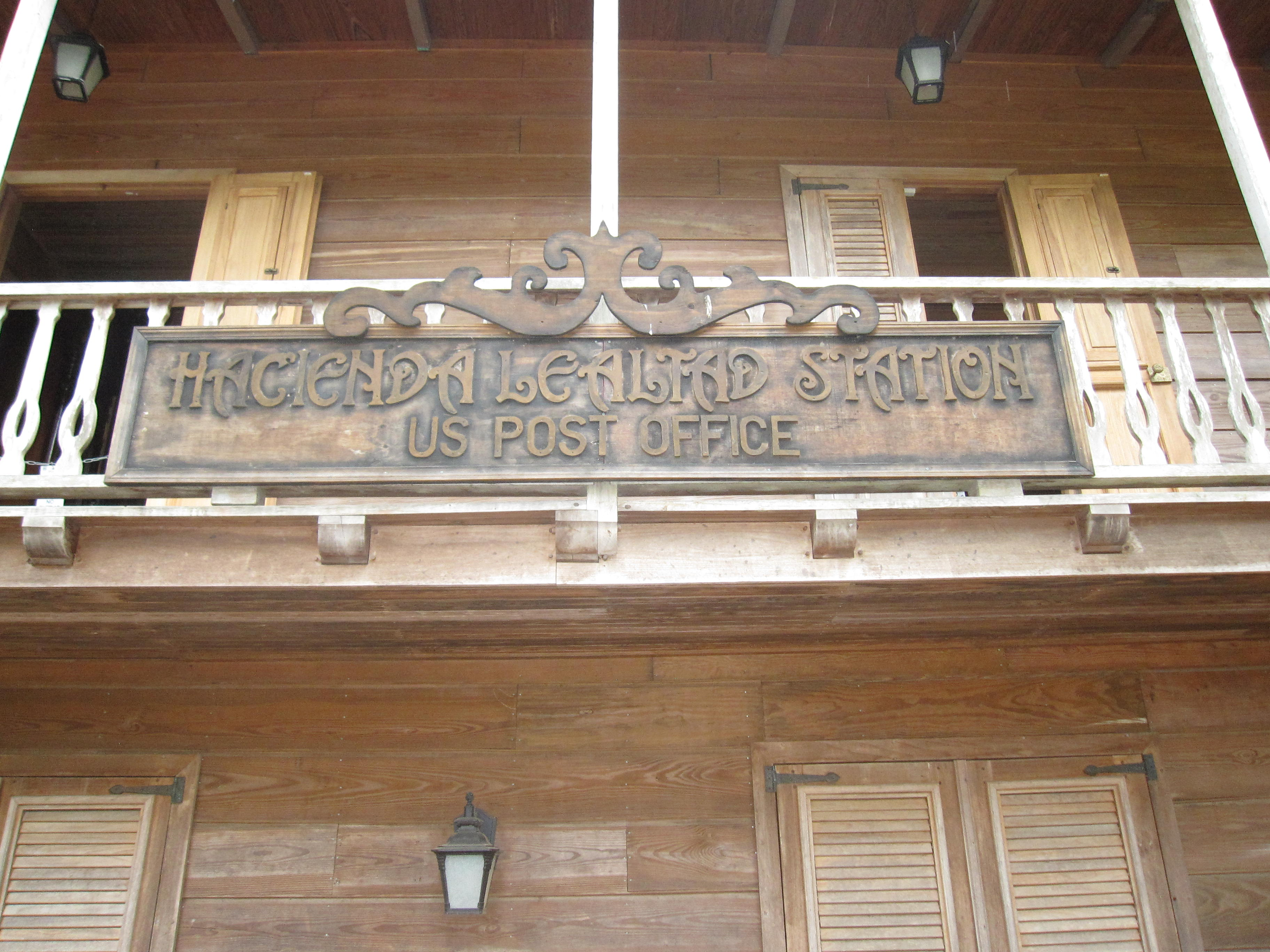
The estate had its own post office.

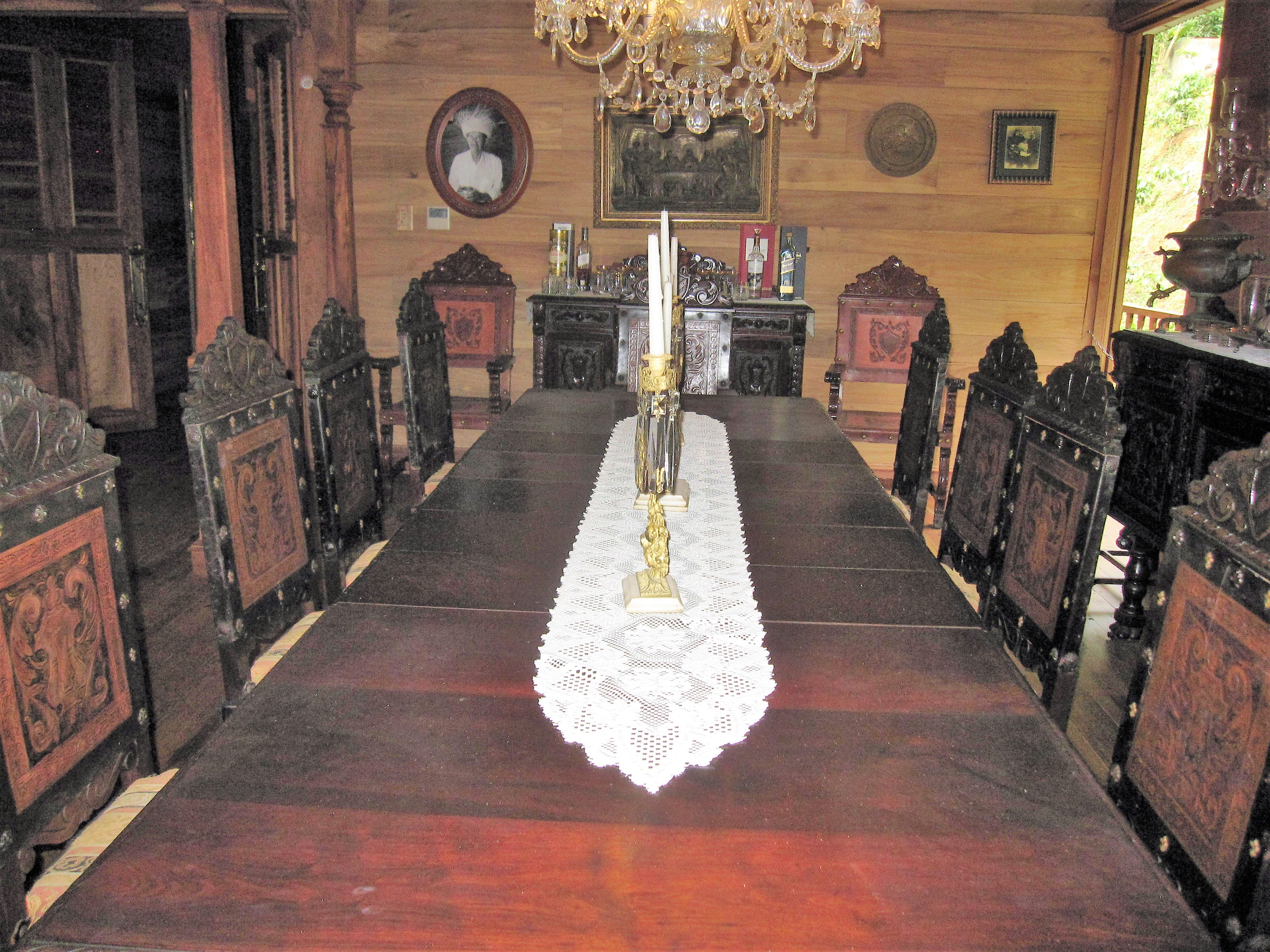
An old, hand-carved dining room set

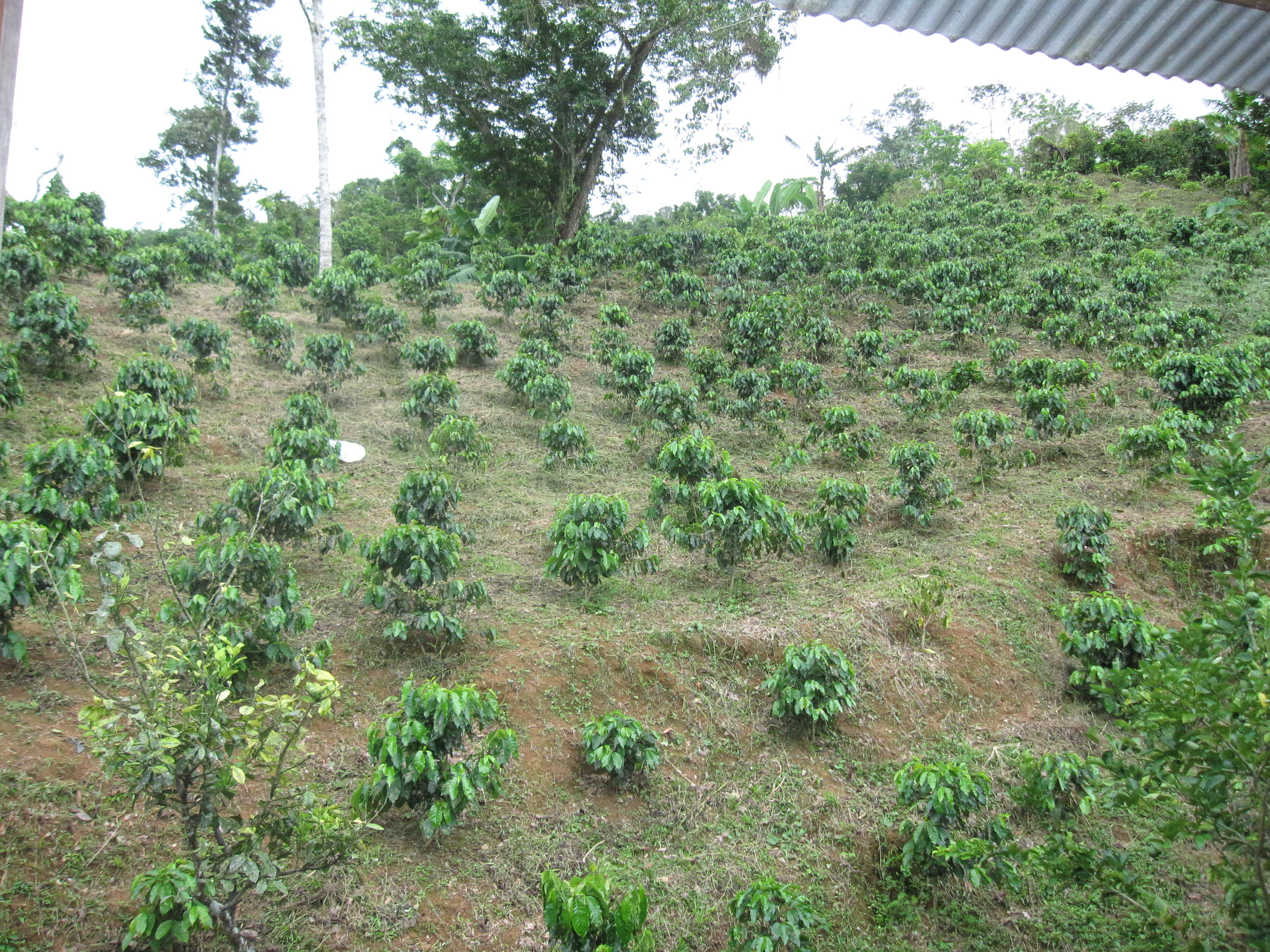
Coffee trees were planted (after Hurricane Maria destroyed all the coffee trees in 2017)

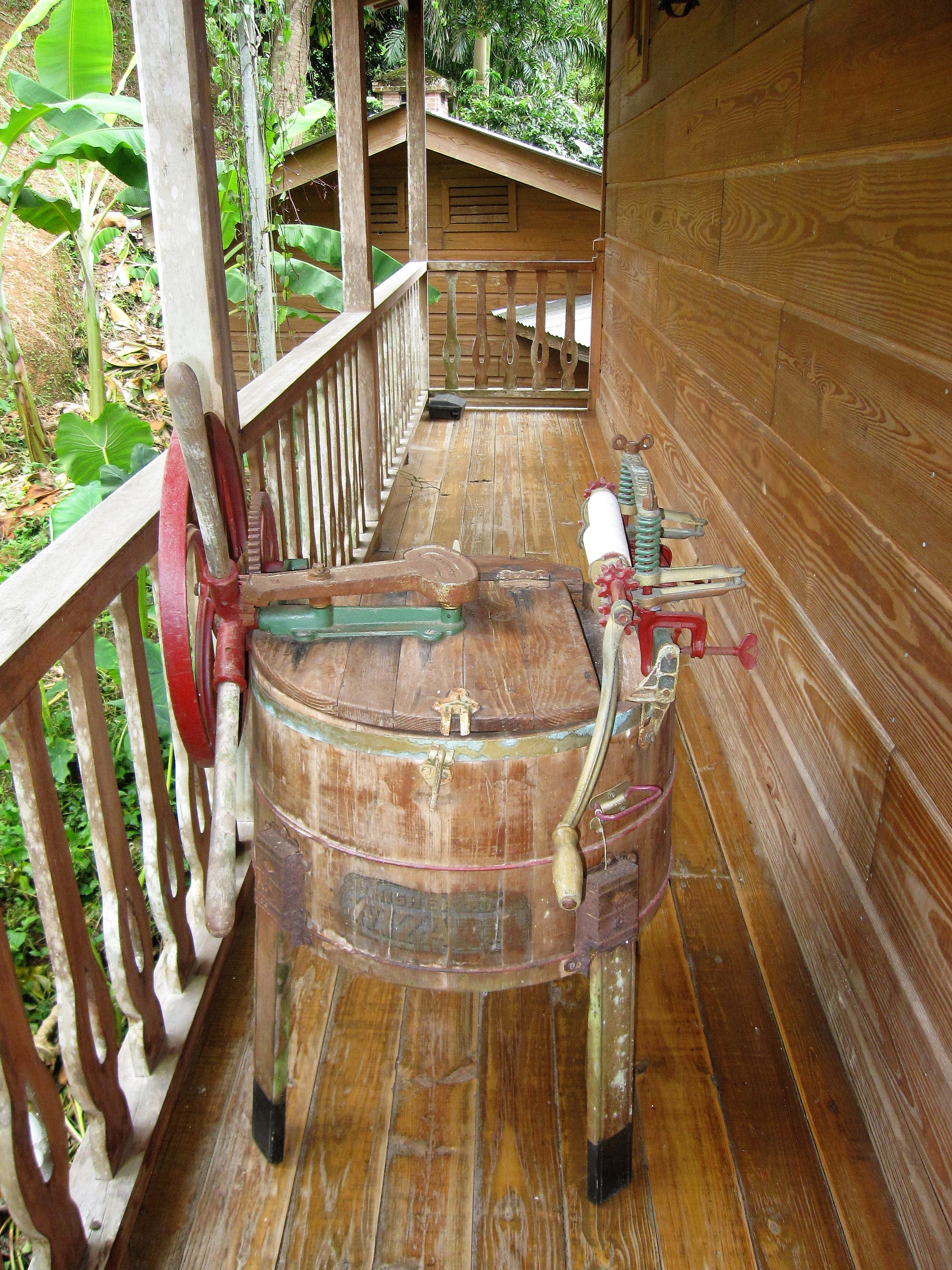
Old washing machine

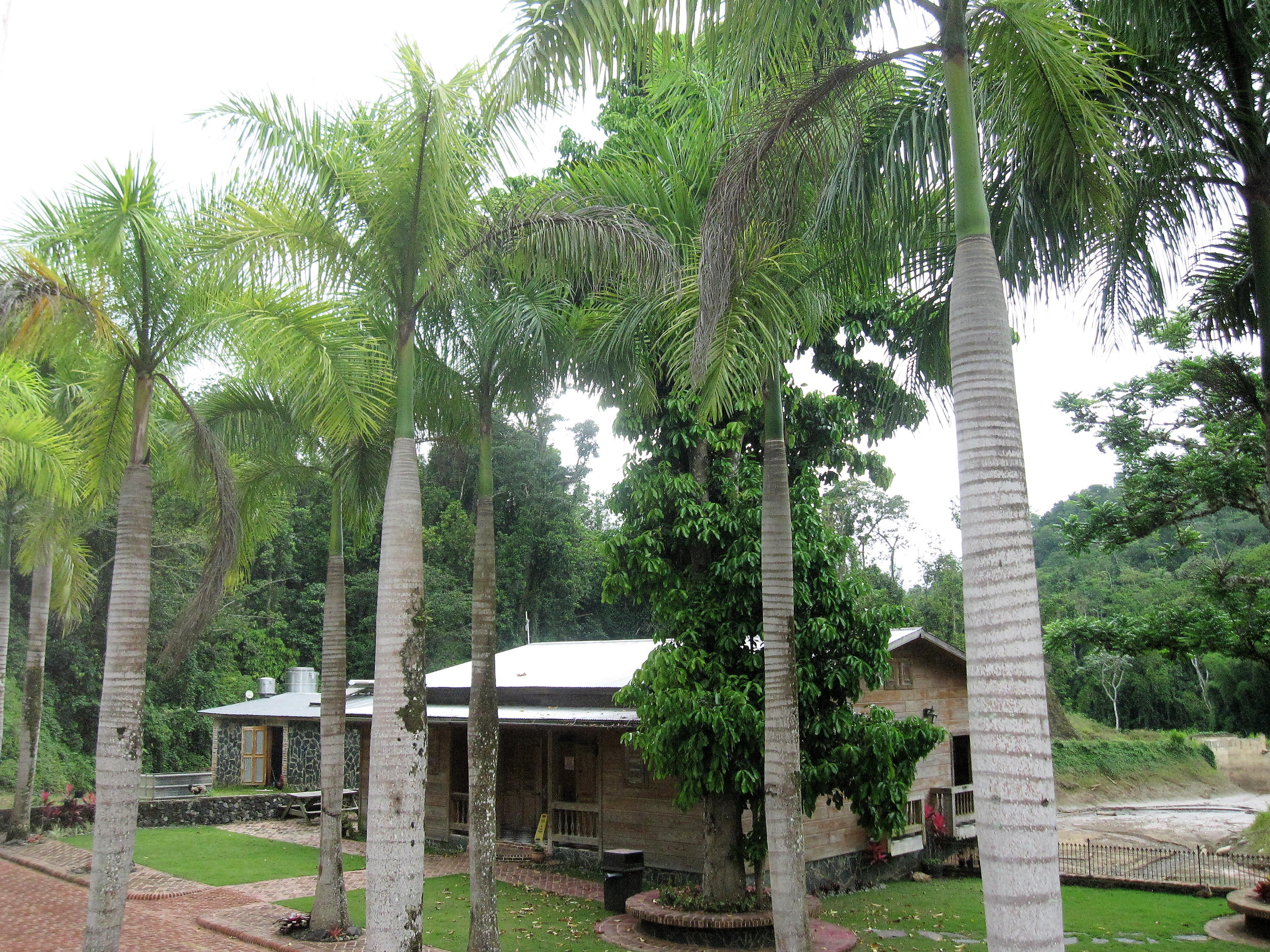
Palm trees

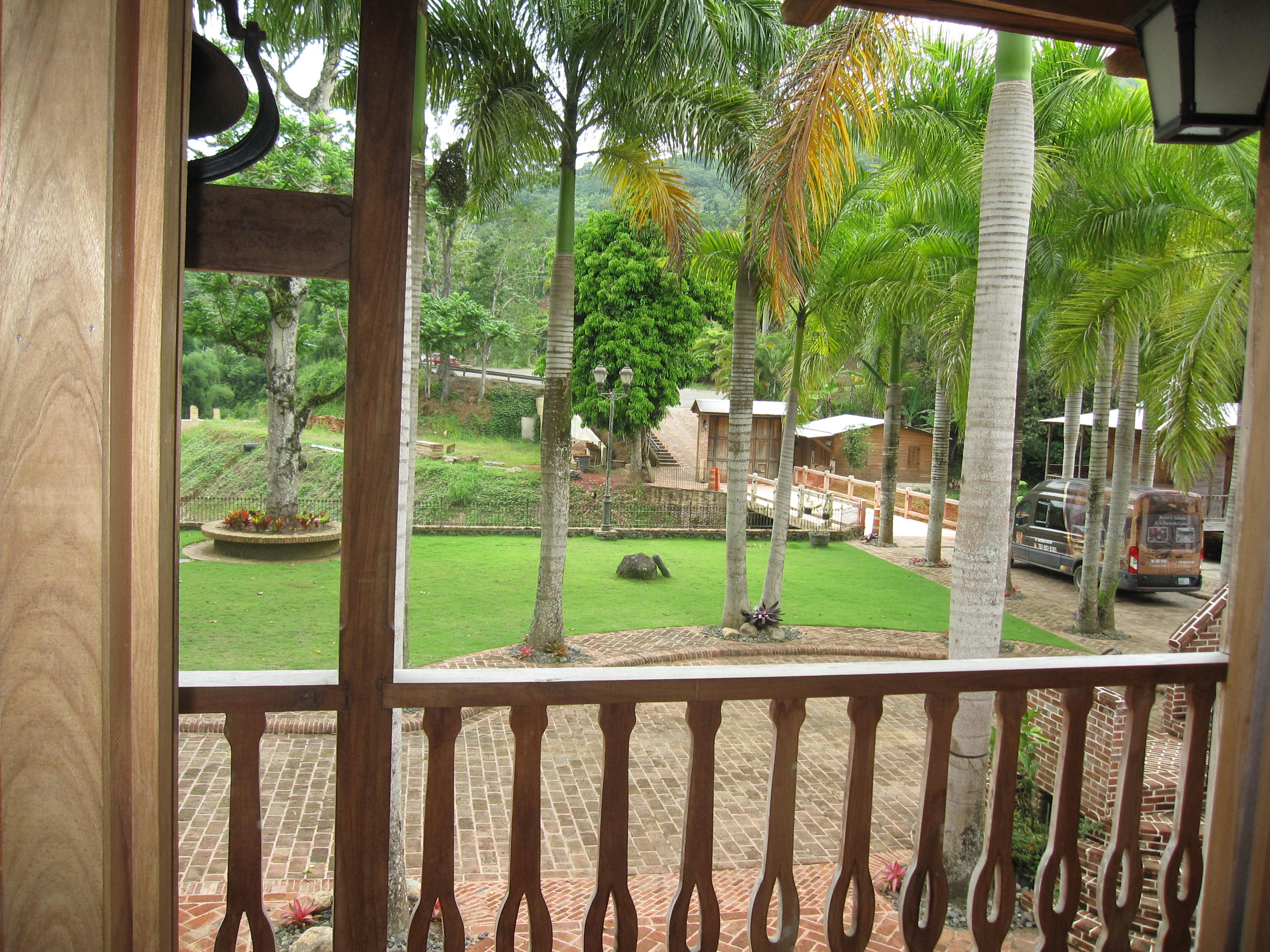
View from inside one of the structures

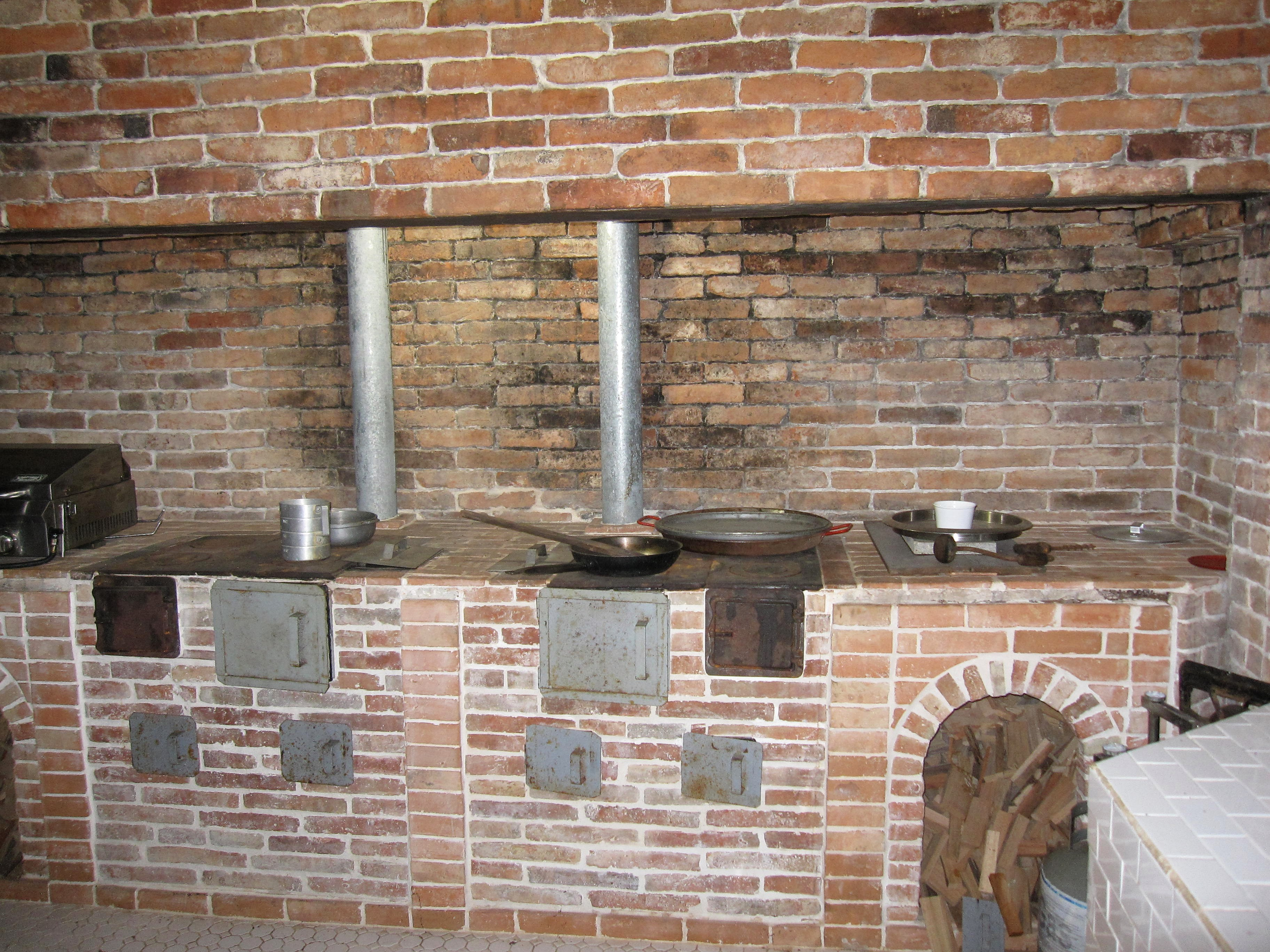
Wood-burning stove

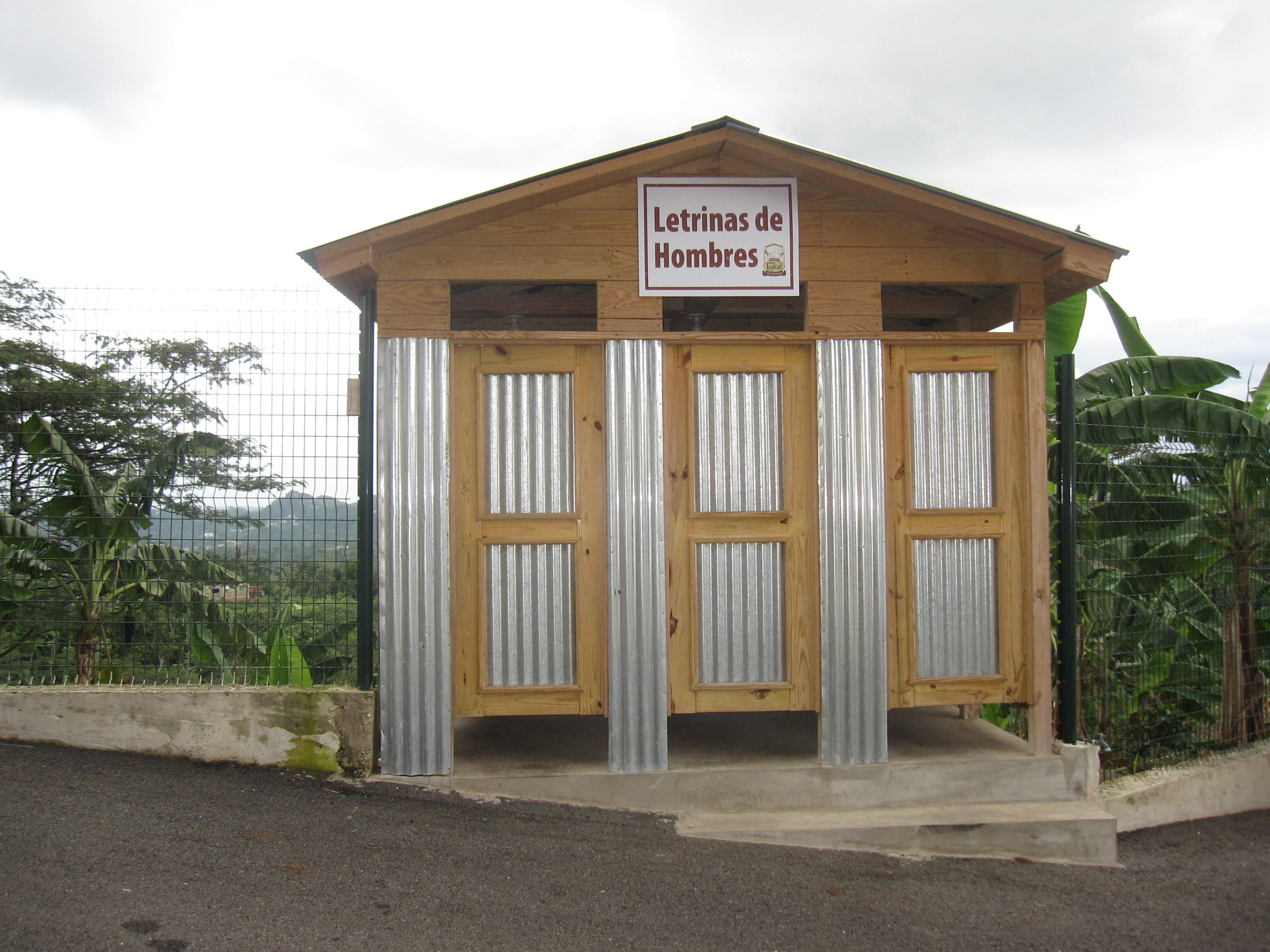
There are latrines at the meeting place for tours

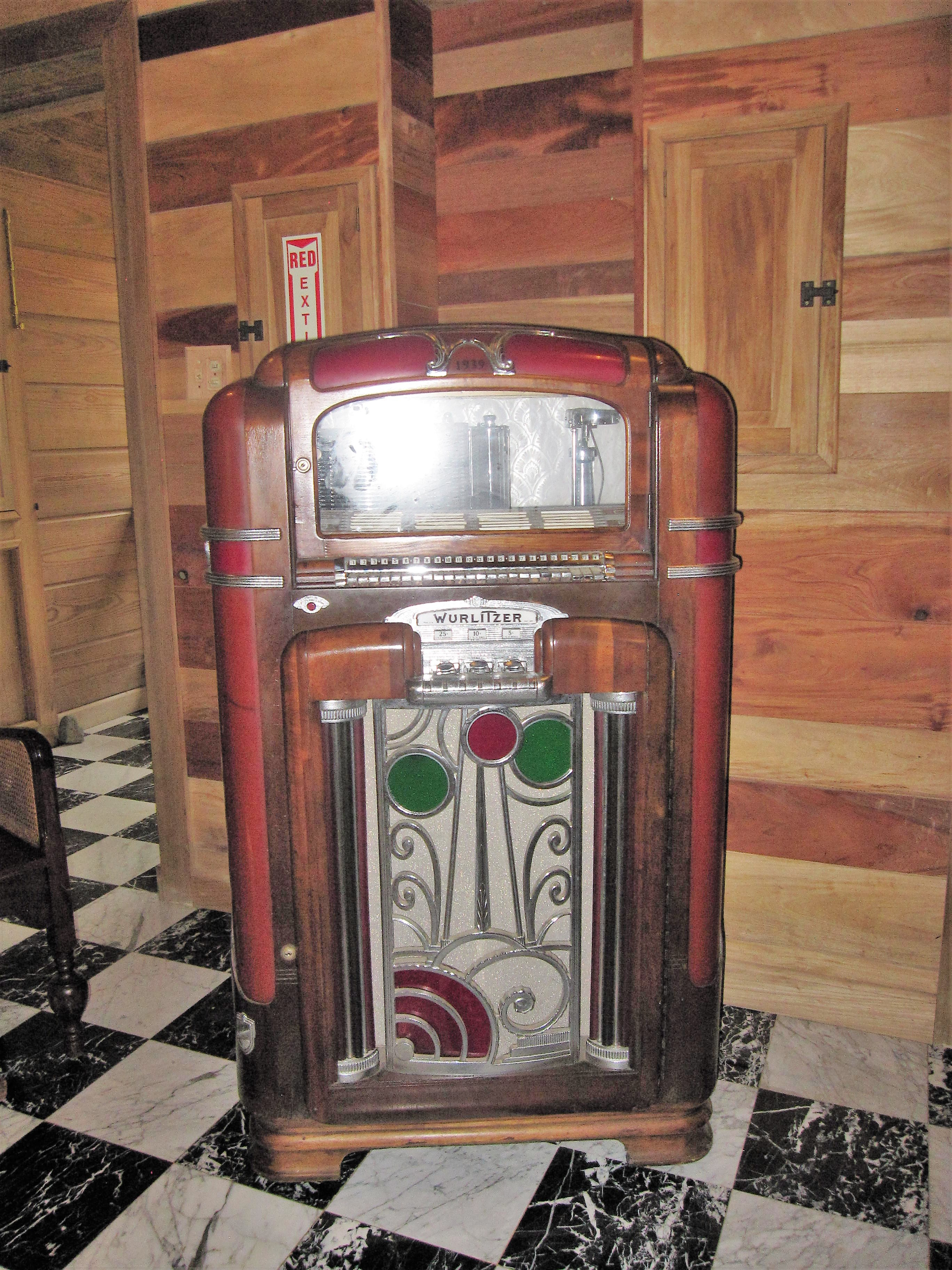
Wurlitzer jukebox in large meeting room at the estate

== See also ==
- Museo Hacienda Buena Vista
- List of hotels in Puerto Rico
- African diaspora in the Americas
- Slavery in the Spanish New World colonies
- French immigration to Puerto Rico
