= Cemetery museum =

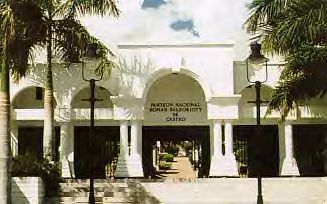
Panteón Nacional Román Baldorioty de Castro a former cemetery is today preserved as a museum

A cemetery museum is a graveyard where the cemetery itself is the museum. As most other types of museums its purpose is to educate the visitor, in this case, in the history of the cemetery and/or the people interred in it. It does this by raising public interest in the cemetery, exposing the role it may have played at some point in history, and promoting the history behind it. They are generally cemeteries that have become tourist attractions. Given their nature, cemetery museums fall under the broader category of open air museums.

== Purpose and settings ==
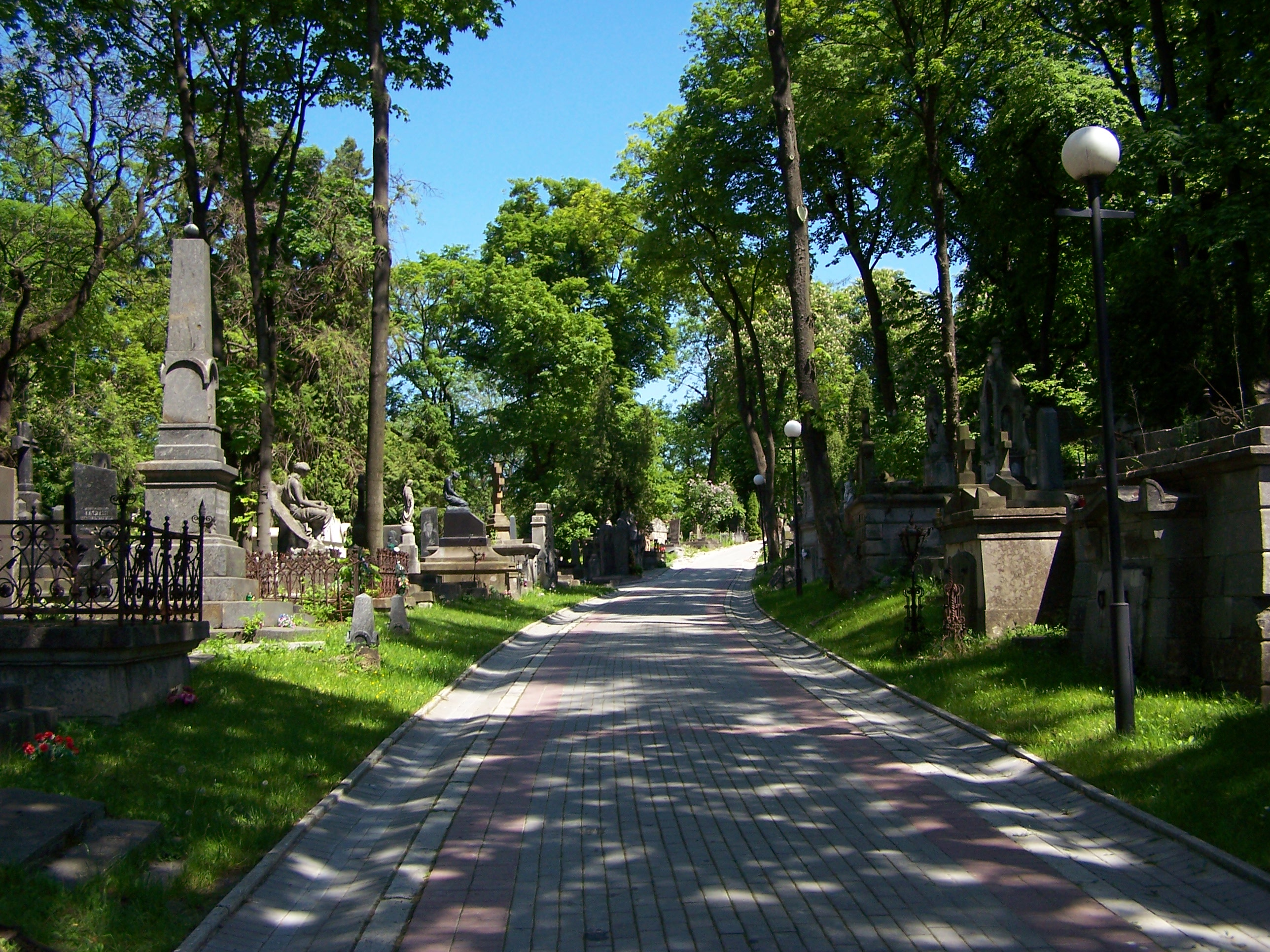
Park-like setting at Lychakiv Cemetery in Ukraine

Some cemetery museums, like the Ohlsdorf Cemetery museum were founded to promote historical and contemporary funeral culture, while others, like the San Pedro Cemetery Museum, were created as a space to erect funerary monuments in memory of prominent figures in the history of a country, region, or human endeavor, such as politics, arts, science or the humanities.

Some cemetery museums, like the Tikhvin Cemetery museum, were envisaged primarily as a landscaped park, while others, like the Panteón Nacional Román Baldorioty de Castro have achieved the status of an urban pantheon on their own right.

== Archaeological sites ==
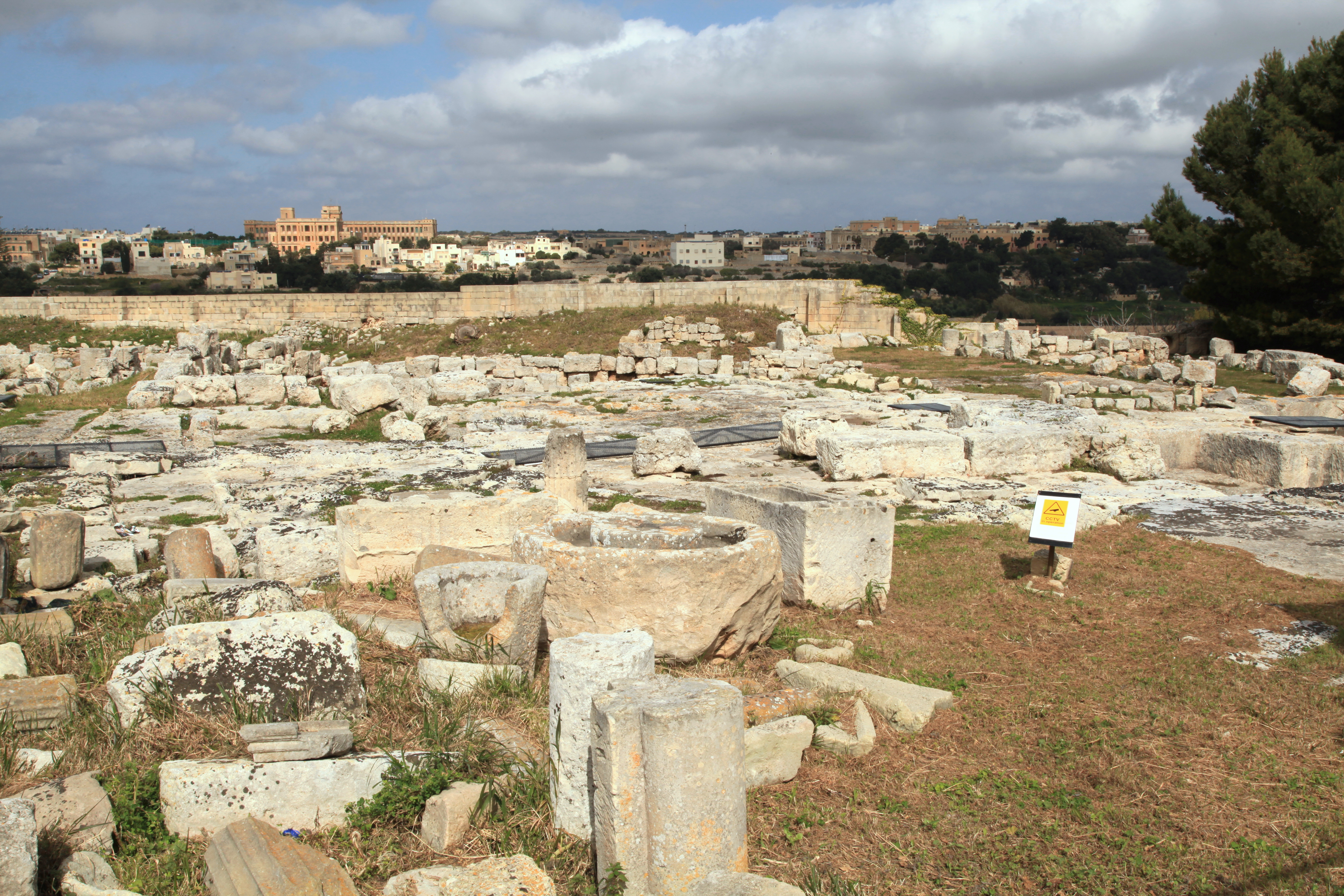
Partial view of the Museum of Roman Antiquities, an archaeological site

Some cemetery museums, like the Tibes Indigenous Ceremonial Center and the Royal Cemetery at Ur are actually so ancient that they are archaeological sites in addition to open-air cemetery museums, and their archaeological findings may be on display either within the cemetery itself or in museums far away, including in other countries. Such museums specialize in the display of artifacts and memorabilia related to archaeological excavations in tombs. Some cemetery museums, like the Museum of Roman Antiquities have experienced the opposite fate and become the central location for cemetery artifacts from other site, even from non cemetery or cemetery museums.

Still, other cemetery museums are known for the uniqueness of their tombs. For example, the Merry Cemetery has gained notoriety for the colorfulness of the tombs that make it up.

== See also ==
- International Council of Museums
- International Museum Day (18 May)
- List of museums
- .museum
- Museum education
- Museum fatigue
- Museum label
- Types of museum
