= Farm museum =

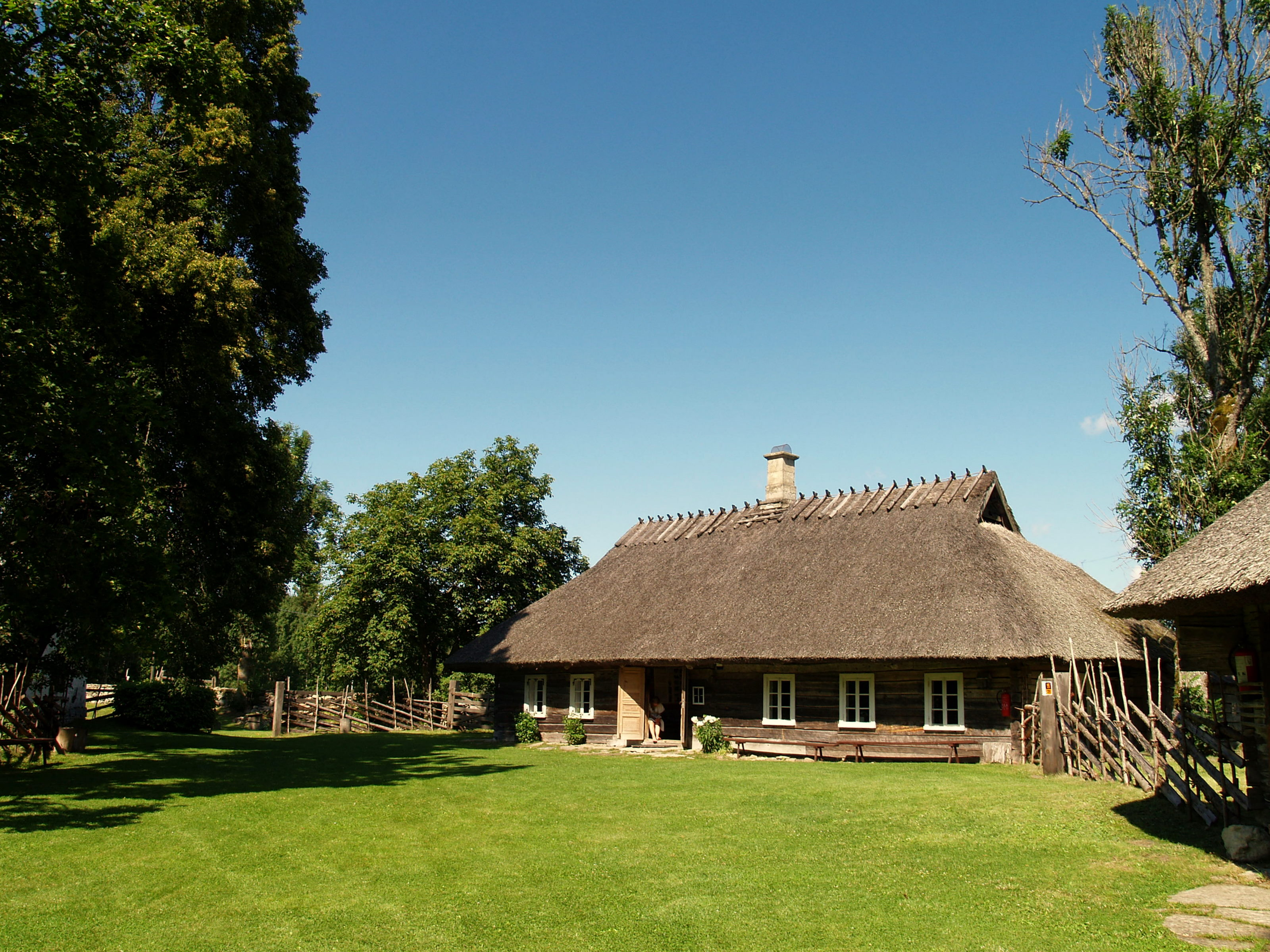
Mihkli Farm Museum in Viki, Estonia.

A farm museum, or museum farm, is a museum based on a historical farm and its buildings, presenting agricultural history. Often the farm is still a working farm, for demonstration and educational purposes. Occasionally these museums are required to move from their original locations to a new site. This relocation can occur for various reasons, such as preservation efforts, urban development, expansion, or improved accessibility for visitors.

== Notable examples ==
Farm museums and living history sites around the world include:

- The Farmer's Museum (Cooperstown, New York, USA) is a unique institution offering a glimpse into the lives of rural Americans.
- Ross Farm Museum (New Ross, Nova Scotia, Canada) is an authentic, living heritage site that explores life on a Nova Scotia family farm over 100 years ago.
- The Museum of English Rural Life (MERL) (Reading, England) focusing on the history of English farming and the countryside, with extensive collections of objects, archives, and photographs.
- National Museum of Agriculture (Prague, Czech Republic) includes six historic sites and collections that explore technology, rural life, hunting, forestry, and brewing.

== See also ==
- Open-air museum
- Rural American history
