= Timeline of Ponce, Puerto Rico =

Coordinates: 18.45°N 66.066667°W

The following is a timeline of the history of the city of Ponce, Puerto Rico.

== Pre 16th century ==
- 600-1000AC – The Ponce areas of El Tuque, Punta Cucharas, Caracoles and Tibes, among others, are inhabited by Igneri and pre-Taino cultures.

== 16th century ==
- 1508 – Cacique Agüeybaná, the cacique who led the region of which Ponce was a part, greets Spanish conquistador Juan Ponce de León on his arrival to the island of Puerto Rico.
- 1511 – Agüeybaná II, the cacique of the area that would later be known as Ponce, leads the Taíno rebellion of 1511 against the Spanish invaders but later dies of battle wounds.
- 1550 – Or, middle of the 16th century. Residents of San German spread out to the plains of the southern coast of Puerto Rico as far as Rio Jacaguas, now part of Ponce, to raise cattle and farm the land.
- 1582 – Colonizers settled on the banks of Rio Jacaguas, Ponce.

== 17th century ==
- 1646 – The area settled by the Spanish colonists is first referred to by the name of "Ponce".
- 1670 – A chapel is erected in the middle of the Spanish settlement and dedicated in honor of Our Lady of Guadalupe.
- 1678 – Governor Juan de Robles Lorenzana attempts to organize the settlement at Ponce with the appointment of a "Capitán a guerra" but, unwilling to formalize the settlement, all of the Ponce residents refuse to accept the post.
- 1692 – The Spanish settlement at Ponce is recognized as a hamlet by Spanish King Carlos II.

== 18th century ==
- 1712 – The populated place is chartered as El Poblado de Nuestra Señora de Guadalupe de Ponce (The village of Our Lady of Guadalupe of Ponce).
- 1724 – Founding of the San Antonio Abad shrine at the location currently occupied by the Ponce City Hall.
- 1740 – The Ponce Catholic parish burns, making it the first of many notorious fires in the city.
- 1742 – The English attack Ponce and the invasion is repelled by local citizens.
- 1760 – Fuerte de San José is built in Barrio Playa.
- 1765 – First census yields a total of 3,314 souls residing in Ponce.
- 1778 – Coamo takes over administrative jurisdiction of the region of Ponce from San German.
- 1787 – The 1787 Boricua earthquake cracks the walls of the Our Lady of Guadalupe church.

== 19th century ==
- 1800 – A census yields a total of 7,234 souls residing in Ponce.
- 1811 - Intendente Alejandro Ramirez (Note: Alejandro Ramirez was chief of the "Superintendencia de Hacienda" in Puerto Rico which, until recently, had been separated from the powers of the Governor (see "Alejandro Ramírez Blanco" in EnCaribe, Enciclopedia de Historia y Cultura del Caribe.)) declares the Port of Ponce open to international commerce.
- 1812:
  - First Constitutional mayor, José Ortíz de la Renta, takes office, and the ayuntamiento is established.
  - Port of Ponce dredged, built and opened.
- 1813 – The naval customs office is established.
- 1814 – First cemetery is built.
- 1816 – Ponce ceases to depend on Coamo for governmental matters and becomes seat of the Southern District government.
- 1819 – First public scrivener (clerk) is appointed.
- 1820:
  - A large fire that "almost destroyed the early Ponce settlement" takes place, prompting Governor Miguel de la Torre to order that "every male from 16 to 60 years old must become a [volunteer] firefighter".
  - The first known division of the village into barrios.
  - Declared seat of one of seven judicial districts in Puerto Rico.
- 1821 – Declared headquarters of Southern Military District.
- 1826 – 10 July: Slave rebellion. Eleven slaves are executed and six other are condemned to 10 years of hard labor.
- 1827 – 26 February: A large fire in Playa de Ponce started by lightning destroys many residential homes and warehouses with estimated losses at $37,000 ($56.9 million in 2025 dollars) Spanish pesos.
- 1833 – Hacienda Buena Vista is established.
- 1836 – Inauguration of Ponce's Ayuntamiento General.
- 1839:
  - The town's chapel is demolished and a new church with two octagonal towers is built in its place.
  - The Court of First Instance is transferred from Coamo to Ponce.
- 1842 – 17 February: Seven slaves are executed at Cerro del Vigía and 6 others received prison sentences ranging from 6 to 10 years for an organized rebellion the previous year (1841).
- 1843 – Mayor Juan Rondón inaugurates the Panteón Nacional Román Baldorioty de Castro cemetery (then called Cementerio Civil) and he is also first person to be buried there.
- 1845 – A fire in Barrio La Playa destroys most of the sea-front settlement
- 1846:
  - The Ponce City Hall is built to be used as a jail.
  - Royal decree organizing the municipal government of Ponce.
- 1848:
  - 29 July: Granted the status of villa (town).
  - A third slave rebellion takes place (see 1826 and 1841).
- 1853 – 17 January: There is a mayor fire in Ponce which, because there were no firefighters yet, was put out by residents and civil and military authorities. It resulted in a campaign for the establishment of a group volunteer firefighters.
- 1857 – Construction of Carretera Central (today's PR-14 and PR-1) begins, joining Ponce and San Juan.
- 1858 – Carnaval de Ponce starts its annual celebration.
- 1863:
  - Plaza de Mercado Isabel Segunda is completed
  - Santo Asilo de Damas is founded by Sister Francisca Paz Cabrera
- 1864:
  - Teatro La Perla, so named to honor the Virgin of Montserrat (who was known as "The Pearl of the Mediterranean.") opens with La Campana de la Almudaina.
  - The Ponce Gas Company is founded by Julio Steinacher.
- 1870:
  - Juan Bertoli builds a home for mayor Ermelindo Salazar which would later become Centro Cultural de Ponce Carmen Solá de Pereira
  - Ponce Municipal Library, Puerto Rico's oldest public library, opens as Gabinete de Lectura.
- 1871 - Logia Aurora Num. 1, a masonic lodge was founded in Islote Caja de Muertos, Ponce.
- 1873 – Iglesia de la Santísima Trinidad, the first Anglican church anywhere in Latin America, is built.
- 1874:
  - 14 January, Verification of the Ponce leg of the transatlantic cable at the Port of Ponce.
  - 18 May, the city is first lit using gas-based lampposts.
  - 8 September, telegraph service begins.
- 1876:
  - Hurricane San Felipe hits Ponce as a Category 4 hurricane.
  - Acueducto de Ponce, the first modern water distribution system built in Puerto Rico, becomes operational.
- 1877 – 16 August: Granted status of city (ayuntamiento).
- 1880:
  - 20 September. A large fire destroys most older civil records (birth, baptism, marriage, etc.) of the Ponce parish.
  - 23 October. The Ponce Railway, running from downtown Ponce to the Port of Ponce starts operation.
- 1882 – Great Agricultural and Financial Fair at Plaza Las Delicias.
- 1883 – Population: 39,052 in city; 155,597 in province (departamento).
- 1885 – Hospital Tricoche opens after an endowment by Valentin Tricoche.
- 1886 – Leaders of the Partido Autonomista Puertorriqueño deliver their Plan de Ponce manifesto, also known as Plan Autonomista de Ponce.
- 1887 – The Spanish activate the Caja de Muertos Light followed, two years later, by the Cardona Island Light.
- 1889 – Cardona Island Light is lit by the Spaniards
- 1894
  - The Spanish military barracks at Ponce are built
  - Population: 37,545.
- 1895:
  - Hotel Meliá opens its doors as a 9-room lodging house on a two-story structure
  - Banco Crédito y Ahorro Ponceño is established.
  - There were 11 consulates in the city.
- 1897:
  - The Spanish military opens a military hospital in Ponce
  - Manuel V. Domenech designs the Rosaly-Batiz Residence for Ponce mayor, Pedro Juan Rosaly.
  - The city is wired for public telephone service.
- 1898:
  - Largest city in the island, Ponce has a population of 22,000.
  - The United States declares war on Spain, invades Puerto Rico, and American General Miles takes the city without resistance as its citizens preferred its beautiful architecture not be destroyed by bombardment.
- 1899:
  - Manuel V. Domenech unveils Residencia Armstrong-Poventud across from the Ponce Cathedral.
  - 25 January 1899 – The "El Polvorin" fire threatens to burn down the city
  - Hurricane San Ciriaco kills 500 people in the city and causes coffee harvest damage from which the coffee industry never recovered.

== 20th century ==
=== 1900-1949 ===
- 1901 – Both Cementerio Católico San Vicente de Paul and Cementerio Civil de Ponce are established
- 1902 – Ponce High School is founded
- 1907:
  - The Puerto Rico Episcopal Church founds Hospital San Lucas.
  - The Methodist Church builds Primera Iglesia Metodista Unida de Ponce in the city; next year it builds Iglesia Metodista Unida de La Playa de Ponce
  - Unión de Gremio de Cocheros de Ponce is founded.
- 1909 – El Día is founded as "El Diario de Puerto Rico; it would be renamed "El Nuevo Día" in 1970 upon its relocation to San Juan
- 1910:
  - Campo Atlético Charles H. Terry is inaugurated
  - The Partido Nacionalista de Puerto Rico meetinghouse, where the Ponce massacre will take place in 1937, is built
  - Blas Silva designs the Residencia Subirá.
- 1911:
  - Casa Salazar-Candal and Casa Serrallés are built
  - The tomb-monument Monumento a los heroes de El Polvorín is erected
  - Alfredo B. Wiechers completes building his home, later termed Casa Wiechers-Villaronga.
- 1913 – Casa Oppenheimer and Casa Font-Ubides are built.
- 1917 – Banco de Ponce opens for business.
- 1918 – The 1918 San Fermín earthquake does major damage to the Teatro La Perla, closing it until 1941, and the Catedral Nuestra Señora de Guadalupe, bringing down its two iconic towers
- 1919 – Puerto Rico Iron Works and Rovira Biscuits Corporation start production
- 1920 – Population: 41,561.
- 1922 – Antiguo Casino de Ponce opens its doors.
- 1924:
  - The Beaux-Arts-style Banco Crédito y Ahorro Ponceño and Banco de Ponce buildings are erected.
  - The Roman Catholic Diocese of Ponce is established.
- 1925 – Dr. Manuel de la Pila Iglesias establishes Clinica Dr. Pila
- 1926:
  - Casa Rosita Serrallés is built
  - Colegio Ponceño de Varones opens its doors
  - Mercado de las Carnes is built to supplement the meat market needs of Plaza de Mercado Isabel Segunda
- 1927 – Casa Fernando Luis Toro is built in La Alhambra, "the first upper-class suburban development ever built in Puerto Rico."
- 1928 – Hurricane San Felipe Segundo impacts Ponce and surrounding areas at Category 5 force.
- 1930
  - Castillo Serrallés is built.
  - Population: 53,430.
- 1931 – Teatro Fox Delicias shows its first movie.
- 1932 – Hurricane San Ciprian launches against the Ponce area destroying citrus, sugar, coffee, tobacco, and other harvests.
- 1933 – The building later renamed the Luis A. Ferré United States Courthouse and Post Office Building opens as a post office and federal courthouse on Calle Atocha.
- 1934 – Bosque Estatal Toro Negro is established with 6,800 cuerdas
- 1936 – WPRP radio begins broadcasting.
- 1937 – US-appointed governor, American Blanton Winship, orders the infamous Ponce massacre.
- 1939 – WPAB radio begins broadcasting.
- 1940
  - WPAB begins transmission
  - Population: 65,182.
- 1941:
  - Club Náutico de Ponce is formed
  - Luis A. Ferre founds Ponce Cement, Inc.
- 1946:
  - – Hospital Oncológico Andrés Grillasca is established.
  - – Three Puerto Ricans from Ponce had been governors of Puerto Rico (José E. Colom, plus two others)
- 1948:
  - Colegio San Conrado is founded
  - Pontifical Catholic University of Puerto Rico starts courses at Colegio San Conrado
  - A replacement to the original monument-obelisk Monumento a los heroes de El Polvorín, destroyed by the 1918 San Fermín earthquake is erected
- 1949 – Estadio Francisco Montaner opens as a baseball park

=== 1950-2000 ===
- 1954 – Enrique "Quique" Lucca Caraballo forms La Sonora Ponceña
- 1955:
  - The Ponce YMCA Building is built and starts its offerings to the youth
  - Mercedita Airport starts operations as a commercial airfield
- 1956:
  - Parque de la Abolición is built together with Concha Acústica de Ponce and the Monumento a la abolición de la esclavitud
  - Ateneo de Ponce is established
- 1957 – Lazare Kaplan establishes the first diamond "factory" at the street that would later be known as Calle Los Diamantes.
- 1958:
  - WRIK-TV Channel 7 and WSUR-TV (television) begin broadcasting.
  - Centro Comercial Santa Maria opens in the Mariani sector of Barrio Canas Urbano
- 1959 – Luis A. Ferré opens Museo de Arte de Ponce at the Ermelindo Salazar Residence with 72 works of art.
- 1960 – The Hotel Ponce Intercontinental opens its doors.
- 1961 – Pontifical Catholic University of Puerto Rico School of Law, the first private law school in the Island, is established
- 1962:
  - Zona Histórica de Ponce is first designated.
  - Industrias Vassallo starts operation molding plastics
  - Universidad Interamericana de Puerto Rico opens a branch in Ponce
- 1963 – Centro Cultural de Ponce Carmen Solá de Pereira starts functioning.
- 1964 – Los Chinos de Ponce start selling ice cream at King's Cream, across Plaza Las Delicias.
- 1967
  - New York City dedicates its Puerto Rican Day Parade to Ponce.
  - The "1692 flag of Ponce" is adopted.
- 1970
  - The University of Puerto Rico opens a campus in Ponce, University of Puerto Rico, Ponce Campus
  - Population: 128,233.
- 1972:
  - ColiseoJuan Pachín Vicéns, now Auditorio Juan Pachín Vicéns debuts
  - Prinair Flight 191 crashes on its approach to Mercedita Airport killing five people.
- 1977:
  - Ponce School of Medicine starts operation as part of the Catholic University of Puerto Rico, but shortly thereafter emerges as an independent institution
  - Policía Municipal de Ponce is reorganized under the new Law of Puerto Rico titled Ley de la Guardia Municipal.
  - A second city flag is adopted, the "1877 flag of Ponce", to commemorate the 100th anniversary of the town being promoted to City of Ponce by the Spanish Crown.
- 1978 – Two young independentista men are murdered at Cerro Maravilla in an ambush by Puerto Rico Police at Cerro Maravilla in Barrio Anón.
- 1980:
  - Parque del Retiro is established on Calle Villa.
  - Caja de Muertos is designated a nature reserve.
  - Cruce a Nado Internacional kicks off its annual sporting event
- 1981 – The huge Plaza de Mercado Juan Bigas building opens, replacing Plaza de Mercado Isabel Segunda, but would close 26 years later to become Ponce Servicios.
- 1983 – Coro de Niños de Ponce debuts.
- 1985 – The Ponce en Marcha Plan is drafted by Governor Rafael Hernández Colón
- 1984 – Cruceta del Vigía and Parque de la Ceiba open to the public.
- 1985 – The Mameyes Landslide tragedy buries over 100 Ponceños while they slept in Barrio Portugues Urbano.
- 1986 – Bienal de Arte de Ponce starts its biannual expositions.
- 1987 – Three museums open their doors: Casa Paoli, Museo Hacienda Buena Vista, and Museo de la Masacre de Ponce.
- 1990 – Four museums open their doors: Museo de la Música Puertorriqueña, Panteón Nacional Román Baldorioty de Castro, Parque de Bombas, Tibes Indigenous Ceremonial Center
- 1991:
  - Museo Castillo Serrallés starts operation as a museum
  - Parque Pedro Albizu Campos is inaugurated
  - Paseo Atocha is converted from a street (Calle Atocha) to a pedestrian mall
  - Residencia Armstrong-Poventud opens as a museum of the Instituto de Cultura Puertorriqueña
- 1992:
  - The city celebrates its 300 anniversary
  - Centro Cultural de Ponce Carmen Solá de Pereira is established at the former Residencia Ermelindo Salazar
  - Museo de la Historia de Ponce occupies the Casa Serralles as a museum
  - Museo Francisco "Pancho" Coimbre opens its doors at the former Campo Atletico Charles H. Terry
  - Parque del Tricentenario's construction is completed
  - Commercial shopping mall Plaza del Caribe is inaugurated
  - Villa Pesquera is organized under the initiative of Mayor Rafael Cordero Santiago
- 1993:
  - Las Justas annual sports event are moved from San Juan to the city of Ponce.
  - The city hosts the 1993 Central American and Caribbean Games.
  - Grand Prix de Ponce starts an annual racing event.
- 1995 – Parque Urbano Dora Colón Clavell opens.
- 1996:
  - Bosque Estatal de Cerrillos is formed with 200 cuerdas of land. It is the only state forest entirely within the municipality
  - Museo de la Arquitectura Ponceña opens the former Casa Wiechers-Villaronga to the public
- 1998 – Paseo Tablado La Guancha is expanded into a multi-use La Guancha recreational complex with boarwalk, beach, tennis courts and observation tower.
- 2000 – Population: 155,038.

== 21st century ==
- 2001 – Denise Quiñones wins the Miss Universe 2001 beauty pageant.
- 2004:
  - Bolera de Ponce reopens as Bolera Caribe; would later host the 2010 Central American and Caribbean Games
  - Letras de Ponce are unveiled
- 2006:
  - Museo del Autonomismo Puertorriqueño opens at Panteón Nacional Román Baldorioty de Castro under mayor Francisco Zayas Seijo
  - Parque Luis A. Wito Morales opens adjacent to the Bosque Estatal de Cerrillos
- 2007:
  - Ponce Grand Prix de Atletismo commences annual track and field competitions at Paquito Montaner
  - Biblioteca Municipal Mariana Suárez de Longo opens at its permanent home on Bulevar Miguel Pou
- 2008:
  - Festival Nacional de la Quenepa begins its yearly celebrations.
  - The Government of Puerto Rico declares Punta Cucharas in Ponce's Barrio Canas a Nature Reserve
- 2009 – Ponce Ramada Hotel opens at the former Casa Saurí house.
- 2011:
  - FC Leones soccer team forms and starts playing at Estadio Paquito Montaner
  - Parque Lineal Veredas del Labrador Phase I opens.
- 2012:
  - Día Mundial de Ponce and the Ponce Jazz Festival are first observed.
  - Parque Ecológico Urbano is inaugurated.
- 2013 – Ponce Servicios opens as the largest municipal office building in the municipality.
- 2020 – Earthquakes destroy numerous historic structures.
- 2021 – Carnaval de Ponce is celebrated on wheels, express-style, due to the COVID-19 pandemic.

== See also ==
- History of Ponce
- National Register of Historic Places listings in Ponce
- List of mayors of Ponce, Puerto Rico
- Subdivisions of Ponce, Puerto Rico
- List of rivers of Ponce
- List of mountains in Ponce
- List of roads in Ponce
- Timelines of other municipalities in Puerto Rico: municipalities in Puerto Rico: Bayamón, Hormigueros (in Spanish), Mayagüez, San Juan

== Bibliography ==
- Robert Thomas Hill (1899), "Cities of Porto Rico: (Ponce)", Cuba and Porto Rico (2nd ed.), New York: Century Company
- Charles Hartzell, ed. (1903), "Sketches of Cities, Towns, and Villages: Ponce", Register of Porto Rico for 1903, San Juan: Louis E. Tuzo and Co., pp. 195+
- "Ponce". Commercial Guide and Business Directory of Porto Rico. New York: F.E. Platt. 1910. pp. 77–101.
- Federal Writers' Project (1940), "Ponce", Puerto Rico: a Guide to the Island of Boriquén, American Guide Series, New York: University Society, pp. 233–251, hdl:2027/mdp.39015030579083, OCLC 245805 – via HathiTrust
