= Ruth Fernández =

Puerto Rican politician and singer

- Also known as: "La Negra de Ponce" (lit. 'The Black Woman from Ponce', a term of endearment in Puerto Rican Spanish)
- Born: Ruth Noemí Fernández Cortada; 23 May 1919; Ponce, Puerto Rico
- Died: 9 January 2012 (aged 92) San Juan, Puerto Rico
- Genres: Bolero; bomba; plena
- Occupations: Singer; politician
- Years active: 1935–2000s

Member of the Puerto Rico Senate from the at-large district
- In office 1973–1981

Personal details
- Party: PPD

Ruth Fernández (born Ruth Noemí Fernández Cortada; 23 May 1919 – 9 January 2012) was a Puerto Rican contralto and a member of the Puerto Rican Senate. According to the "Comisiones Nacionales para la Celebración del Quinto Centenario" (National Commission for the Celebration of the Fifth Centennial), she is said to be one of three artists whose contributions have helped unite Latin America. The other two artists named were Libertad Lamarque from Argentina and Pedro Vargas from Mexico.

== Early years ==
Fernández was born Ruth Noemí Fernández Cortada in the Bélgica community of Barrio Cuarto in Ponce, Puerto Rico to Santiago Fernández and Rosa María Cortada. Fernández's mother died when she was six years old and she was raised along with her four other siblings by her grandmother. She received her primary and secondary education in her hometown. As a child she learned to play the piano and was very active in her school and community's activities. In high school she organized her own musical group. She became a professional singer at the age of 14 when she would go to the local radio stations, WPRP and WPAB, and sing for 50 cents a day, in 1935. Fernandez was heard by Mingo, a bandleader of a locally popular band and was hired into his band in 1940. She then performed in nightclubs, dances and casinos.

== Musical career ==
Fernández started to gain popularity and in 1941, at age 22, she was signed by Columbia Records with whom she recorded her first hit song, "Cuando Vuelvas" (When you return) a theme written by Myrta Silva. Her first appearance in New York City was in The Latin Theater of New York. There the Master of Ceremonies, Hector del Villar, introduced her as "El Alma de Puerto Rico hecha cancion" ("The Soul of Puerto Rico Turned Song"). That moniker was to stay with her forever.

When Fernández returned to the island, she enrolled in the University of Puerto Rico in 1943 with the intention of becoming a social worker. However, she once again joined Mingo and his band, the "Whoopee Kids" and toured with them throughout the Caribbean, Central and South America.

=== Breaking racial barriers ===
External audio
- Ruth Fernández's "Borincana" on YouTube.

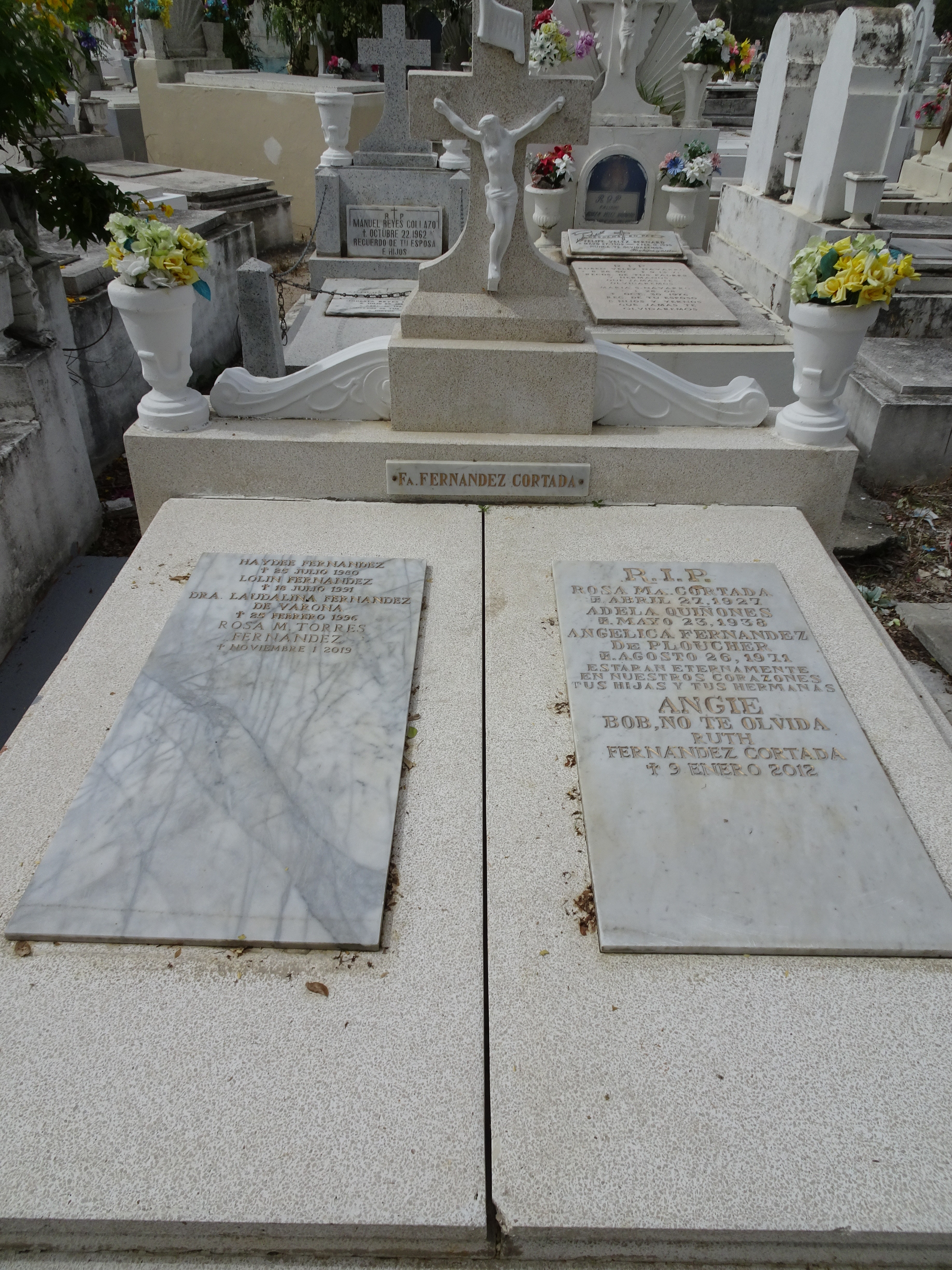
Ruth Fernández's grave at Cementerio Civil de Ponce

Fernández was the very first successful Afro-Puerto Rican female singer, and as such, she broke color barriers and stereotypes. The Mingo band was contracted to perform at a benefit for the American Red Cross in the Condado Vanderbilt Hotel on August 4, 1945. The director of the orchestra told her that according to the hotel's rules, she had to enter through the kitchen door like all other black musicians (a de facto integration rule, illegal at the time in Puerto Rico, but still in place at the time out of concern for American patrons of the hotel). Ruth however, did not follow the instructions and entered through the main entrance, driven by a chauffeur on a Packard automobile. She went on stage and performed before the astonished audience. When asked in a documentary years later how she felt about the incident, she replied: "Me llamaron negra. ¿Negra? ¿Y qué?" ("They called me a negro. Negro? So what?"). She was particularly proud about how well dressed she was that day, "wearing more decorations than Douglas MacArthur". From that point on she proudly and constantly referred to herself (even in songs such as "Soy la que soy") as "La Negra de Ponce" ("The Black Woman from Ponce)", making reference to her racial heritage and her city of origin. She often also joked that she considered herself "Insoportablemente Ponceña" ("unbearably Ponceña").

During World War II and the Korean War, she traveled overseas to entertain the soldiers of Hispanic descent. When she returned to Puerto Rico, she decided to go solo. In 1954, at age 41, Fernández participated in the first televised musical television show in the history of Puerto Rico, "El Show Libby's". She also had many other "firsts": she was the first woman to sing in a Puerto Rican orchestra; the first Puerto Rican woman to sing "popular" music at the Metropolitan Opera House in New York City; the first Latina singer of romantic music to sing in the Scandinavian countries (with some notable success in Norway), and the first Latina to record with a North American band.

She had a long-standing musical partnership with Lito Peña; she recorded two albums with his Orquesta Panamericana, and he wrote and arranged many of her most famous songs. One of these songs includes what has since become a Puerto Rican folk standard, the bomba song "(La Bomba) ¡Ay, qué rica es!". She also recorded with Machito Grillo's orchestra and with Los Hispanos as backup singers.

Fernández' performances in the United States were transmitted coast to coast under her contract with the CBS radio network. She also performed at the Carnegie Hall in New York in 1960. Among the many countries in which she has performed are Italy, France, Spain, Norway, Venezuela, Mexico, Panama, and Cuba. Fernandez has also appeared in two Spanish-language films, and has a role in the Afro-Puerto Rican documentary "Raíces", produced by the Banco Popular de Puerto Rico.

== Personal life ==
Fernández was twice married, with both marriages ending in divorce. Fernández had no children; because of her public acknowledgement of her nephews and nieces, and because of her philanthropic work with children, many Puerto Ricans nicknamed her "Titi Ruth" (Auntie Ruth), a term popularized by comedian José Miguel Agrelot. Flutist Néstor Torres is one of her nephews.

=== Optimism ===
Fernandez always stressed the positive in her life and in her interaction with people. Her most often repeated quote is "¡Arriba, corazones!" ("Hearts, go up!"). Fernández's signature song is the Lito Peña composition "Gracias, Mundo" ("Thank you, World"), which, in a way similar to Louis Armstrong's "What a Wonderful World", depicts the planet in a very optimistic way. In many occasions, particularly at charity telethons, Fernández would be asked to sing the song as a closer, which she would do willingly. With some reluctance, but agreeing to it as to show she was a good sport, she accepted neighbor Sunshine Logroño's request to sing the song as the theme for his satirical movie, "Chona, La Puerca Asesina" (Chona, The Killer Pig), as a way to emphasize the deeds of Cambucha, the film's hero (played by Puerto Rican actress and singer Nena Rivera) of saving Puerto Rico from the giant piglet after which the film is named.

== Awards and recognitions ==
Among the many awards and recognitions which have been bestowed upon her are:

- The Medal of Vasco Nuñez de Balboa from Panama;
- The Order of Francisco de Miranda from Venezuela;
- an Honorary Doctorate from the World University and
- the declaration of a "Ruth Fernandez Day" in the cities of Washington, D.C., New York City, Los Angeles, and in Puerto Rico.
- In 1963, Pablo Casals wrote and dedicated to Ruth Fernandez the song "Ven a Mi" (Come to Me).
- In Ponce, she is recognized as one of Ponce greatest musicians at the Park of the Illustrious Ponce Citizens

In 1985, she was given a tribute in recognition of the 50 years which she has dedicated to the artistic world with the participation of Mario Moreno "Cantinflas", Libertad Lamarque, Pedro Vargas, Olga Guillot and many others. She was also named by 500th Centennial commission as one of the three Latin American artists who have contributed the most in uniting Latin America.

In 2000, she was paid a tribute in the Antonio Paoli Hall of the Luis A. Ferré Center for the Performing Arts in Puerto Rico. During the tribute she was proclaimed "The Singer of the Century" of Puerto Rico.

In June 2012, the Senate of Puerto Rico approved Resolución Conjunta del Senado 957 (Joint Senate Resolution 957) to rename the Museo de la Música Puertorriqueña in Ponce as Museo de la Música Puertorriqueña Ruth Fernández in honor of the singer from Ponce.

== Political life ==
She was elected into the Senate of Puerto Rico, as a At-large member of the Senate from the Popular Democratic Party. Her loyalty to the party had been long standing: when Rafael Hernández Colón first ran for governor of Puerto Rico in 1972, Fernández sang a campaign jingle for his campaign.

As a legislator, Fernández sought many reforms and better working conditions for the artistic class. She also looked after the needs of Puerto Ricans living in the United States; a tenement in The Bronx, New York, is named after her, Ruth Fernández Apartments. After her senatorial term was over, she served as a cultural adviser to Hernández Colón. In 1990, she was selected by Imagen (Image) magazine as one of the ten most powerful women in Puerto Rico.

At one time she led Casa del Artista Puertorriqueño (House of the Puerto Rican Artist), an organization that vouched for the development of young rising Puerto Rican artists. Her controversial tenure, spanning over a decade, resulted in the granting of $500,000 to the organization with which it purchased Teatro Coribantes, a theater near San Juan's Hato Rey financial district.

== Retirement and death ==
Fernández retired from all activities in the 2000s. She acknowledged suffering from Alzheimer's disease, but 2010 newspaper interviews depicted her as having occasional moments of (very candid) lucidity. She died in San Juan on 9 January 2012 of a septic shock and pneumonia. The government of Puerto Rico declared three days of national mourning for her death. She was buried in her hometown of Ponce at Cementerio Civil de Ponce.

== See also ==
- List of Puerto Ricans
- History of women in Puerto Rico
