= Residencia Ermelindo Salazar =

Historic house in Ponce, Puerto Rico

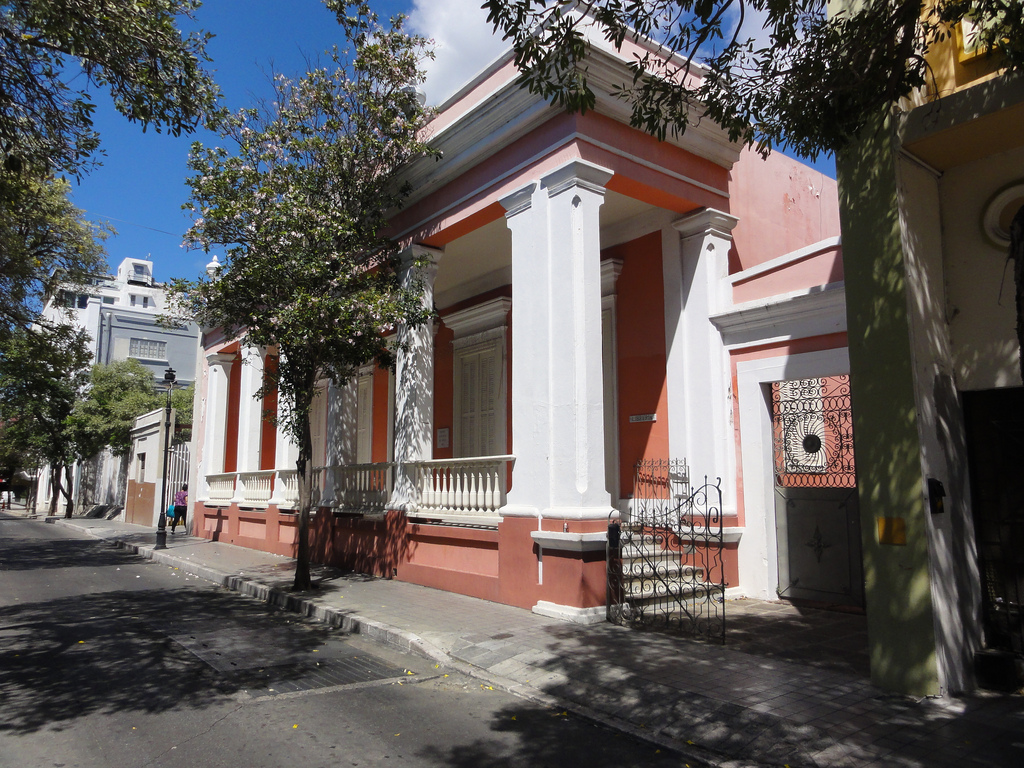
- Residencia Ermelindo Salazar, in Barrio Tercero, Ponce, Puerto Rico
- Interactive map of the Residencia Ermelindo Salazar area

General information
- Architectural style: Ponce Creole
- Location: 70 Cristina Street, Ponce, Puerto Rico
- Coordinates: 18°00′43.092″N 66°36′45.3234″W
- Completed: 1870
- Client: Ermelindo Salazar

Design and construction
- Architect: Juan Bertoli Calderoni
- Engineer: Juan Bertoli Calderoni

Residencia Ermelindo Salazar (Ermelindo Salazar Home) is a historic house in Ponce, Puerto Rico. It was built in 1870 as the home of Ermelindo Salazar, a prominent citizen and businessman in the city as well as its mayor in 1880. It is located at 70 Cristina street in the Ponce Historic Zone, in Barrio Tercero, Ponce, Puerto Rico. Today the house serves as the headquarters of the Centro Cultural de Ponce Carmen Solá de Pereira, the cultural center of the city of Ponce, where it is used for educational and cultural activities as well as for art exhibits.

== History ==
In the 1980s the structure was purchased by the Institute of Puerto Rican Culture as the first location of the Museum of Puerto Rican Music. Since 1992 it serves as home to the Centro Cultural de Ponce, "actively promoting the artistic development on [Ponce]’s rich educational and intellectual environment", including the Noches de Galería, "where renowned as well as promising painters, artisans and sculptors exhibit their works and showcase their talent."

== Structure ==
The structure, located at 18° 0' 44.244" N, 66° 36' 39.9528" W (18.01229000°N 66.611098000°W), was designed in 1870 by the Corsican architect Juan Bertoli Calderoni. Its style incorporates elements of Colonial Spanish and Ponce Creole architecture. Its courtyard is surrounded by a gallery. The building was originally built as the former home of Ermelindo Salazar, a prominent landowner, merchant, banker, as well as mayor of Ponce in 1880. In 1959 the building became the first home of the Museo de Arte de Ponce. Museo de Arte de Ponce moved to its current facility on Avenida Las Americas in 1965, vacating the structure at 70 Cristina Street. In 1990, the Instituto de Cultura Puertorriqueña restored the structure to house the first headquarters of the Museo de la Música Puertorriqueña.

The house has the distinction of being the first one in the city to be served by a private telephone line. The line exclusively communicated the owners’ family residence with their commercial offices at the Ponce port. This was 17 years before the service finally arrived to the rest of the city.

== See also ==
- Centro Cultural de Ponce Carmen Solá de Pereira
