= Casa Vives =

- U.S. National Register of Historic Places
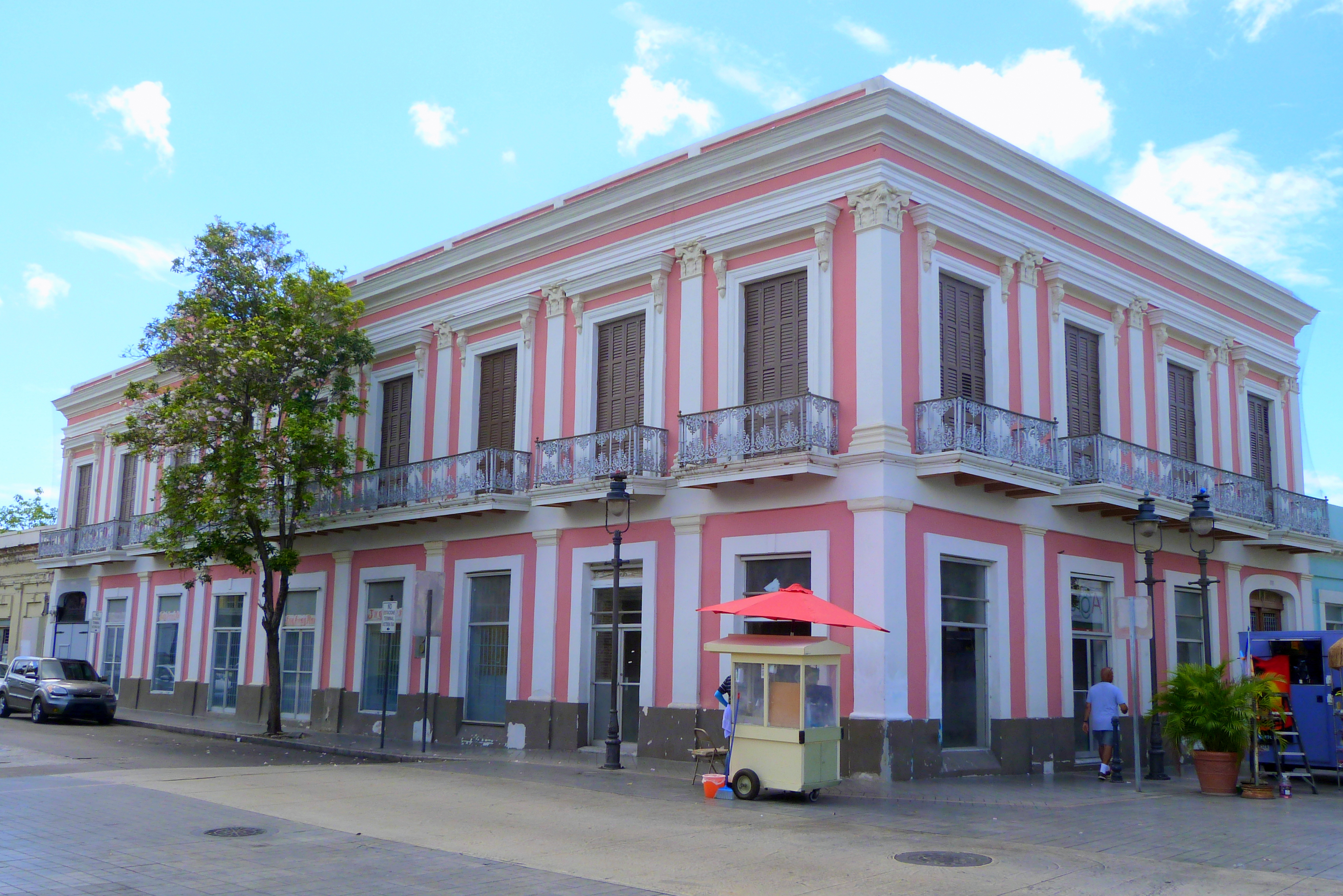
- Casa Vives in 2017

- Location within Puerto Rico
- Location: 88 Paseo Atocha at Calle Castillo; Ponce, Puerto Rico
- Coordinates: 18°00′51″N 66°36′49″W
- Area: 1,174 square meters (12,640 sq ft)
- Built: 1860
- Architect: Juan Bertoly Carderoni
- Architectural style: Neoclassical
- NRHP reference No.: 13000013
- Added to NRHP: 13 February 2013

Casa Vives (Vives House) is a historic building located in the Ponce Historic Zone in Ponce, Puerto Rico, across from the Plaza de Mercado de Ponce. The home was designed by Juan Bertoli Calderoni for Carlos Vives, a prominent local merchant and owner of Hacienda Buena Vista, and built by Carlos Milan. The home was built in 1860, in the neoclassical style, making it one of the first brick and mortar homes built in the city. It was added to the U.S. National Register of Historic Places on 13 February 2013. Architecturally, Casa Vives retains all seven aspects of integrity: location, design, setting, materials, workmanship, feeling and association.

== Introduction ==
Casa Vives is a two-story, L-shaped brick and masonry building located at 88 Paseo Atocha, corner of Castillo Street, two blocks north from the town's main plaza in the traditional urban center in the municipality of Ponce. The flatroofed with parapet structure was built in 1860 in the Neoclassical tradition. The residence occupies a lot of 1,174 square meters. Believed, by the Puerto Rico Office of Historic Preservation, to have been designed by local architect Juan Bertoli Calderoni and built by Carlos Milan, Casa Vives's elegance, details, materials and quality of craftsmanship, is one of the best preserved 19th century houses in the island. The building epitomizes the quintessential architecture associated with the 19th century upper classes that projected their class vision upon the built landscape of the major urban centers in the island, being the city of Ponce its best example.

== Location and purpose ==
Casa Vives sits in a very prominent corner lot, with its residential entrance facing Atocha Street, the main commercial artery within the traditional urban core. The longitudinal axis of the building's elevation faces Castillo Street, another important commercial artery, across from the 19th century Plaza del Mercado building. The Neoclassical Casa Vives building has a dominating presence within the area. During the second half of the 19th century, the construction period of Casa Vives, the city's well-to-do citizens shaped the urban center in many ways, one of these being through its architecture, one of the most enduring means. This urban bourgeoisie competed for social status and public recognition using architecture to express their personal achievement and social aspirations. Their residences became social statements that ultimately differentiated Ponce's architecture from any other urban center in the Island, and ultimately created the unique and internationally recognized Ponce Creole architectural style. In contrast to Old San Juan, for example, whose residential architecture materialized through the repetitious application of an anonymous facade representing the official establishment's homogeneous parameters, Ponce's urban center developed around individual buildings where each family strove to impress through the built landscape their individuality. The social discourse of Ponce's urban center facades created an urban element based, contrary to Old San Juan, not on homogeneity but on its diversity. Sociologist Angel Quintero Rivera has suggested that the elaboration of Ponce's residential urban center facades manifest a cultural character associated to a Manorial worldview, where the patrician families, upon their "generosity", perceived their residence as a gift to the public and a way to embellish and dignify their city. In Puerto Rico, Casa Vives is considered one of the best remaining examples of homes in this social context.

== Design description ==
Due to its dual commercial and residential purpose, the building's facade design received a different treatment than those of most other homes of the time. Thus, in the first level, the neoclassical elements are austere; the exterior is articulated by the doors and windows openings. These openings are framed by moldings and pilasters resembling Tuscan columns. The pilasters are crowned by an unadorned, flat architrave that runs along the entire facade, clearly dividing the commercial first floor from the residential upper level. The second level received a more complex treatment, to emphasize its residential and, thus, social significance. The upper level facade is completely articulated around its many openings. There are 13 sets of wooden double doors with adjustable louvers, nine facing Calle Castillo and four overlooking Paseo Atocha. Each doorway is accentuated by a combination of balconies, plaster moldings and pediments, all framed by a rhythmic articulation of Corinthian pilasters. The balconies have the original 19th century wrought iron grilles. The facade is crowned with a sober, but strong entablature. The Tuscan and Corinthian pilaster accent the building vertically, against its massive and dominating horizontal facade.

=== Commercial first floor ===
The building's lower level has been historically used for commercial purposes. As a corner lot, the first floor L-elevation has one square-shaped volume facing west towards Paseo Atocha, while the other two commercial spaces occupy the longitudinal axis that runs east-to-west along Castillo Street. The commercial spaces are of different sizes. In all three sections, the original floors were replaced with native tiles, product of an early 20th century intervention. The 12-foot high ceiling in the square-shaped section is covered with pressed tin panels, a decorative addition very frequently used during the 1920s among the upper class' residences and social/civic buildings in different cities in Puerto Rico. Meanwhile, the 17-foot high ceiling in the other two commercial areas have kept the original exposed ausubo (manilkara bidentata tree) beams, sustaining the pichipen rafters, which support three layers of thin bricks that make-up the foundation for the upper-level floor. Throughout the entire first floor's interior, the stucco has been removed, leaving the brick walls completely exposed. Each commercial section has its own service room. The 110'-5" long longitudinal elevation that faces Castillo Street has a very public exposure with four large clear glass windows and an equal number of clear-glass-metal-framed doors. The axis that faces Paseo Atocha has an additional glass door and two large glass windows. All three spaces at the first floor have access to a narrow backyard limited by a seven-foot high brick and masonry wall, which runs east-to-west, and separates the commercial space, physically and visually, from a large open garden-like interior patio only accessible to the upper-level residents. The Castillo Street axis has, on its eastern end, an arched wooden gate, that provide access to the cochera (carport), which by the time Casa Vives was built in the 1860s, served to properly house the family's horse stagecoach, and later, during the early twentieth century, housed the Ford's model T's and Model A's.

=== Residential second floor ===
The residential second-story is accessed thorough an original double-door wooden gate facing Paseo Atocha. Beyond the entrance, an imposing zaguan (hallway), with a 17-foot high ceiling with exposed beams and rafters, and richly stenciled decorated walls, surprised the visitor. Midpoint in the zaguan, a Roman arch, painted to simulated marble, creates a transition point and serves to visually frame a magnificent eight risers, bronze handrails, marble flared stair. At the stair's landing, there are two identical richly crafted iron grilled gates. One guards the entrance to the second floor, while the other one does the same to and from the patio. At the gate's upper portion that faces the zaguan, within a golden painted circle, the metal is curved to form the letters CV, the initials of Carlos Vives, the 1860s owner of the house. A northerly left turn at the landing guides the visitor into a marble straight staircase with bronze handrails, up to the second floor.

In the second level, the living quarters consist of 15 rooms divided among sleeping quarters, living room, antesala, dining room, kitchen (with an original 19th century stove), bathroom and studio/library. The layout responds to the L-shaped arrangement. A massive rectangular volume, divided in three spacious rooms with 15-foot high ceilings, faces west overseeing Paseo Atocha. The bedrooms, kitchen, bathroom and dining room are lined-up along the longitudinal axis, facing north overlooking Calle Castillo. This section of the quarters, the most private section of the house, also faces south, towards the interior courtyard. The entrance to each room in the longitudinal axis is accentuated by the use of a classical pediment framing each doorway. Each room facing the patio, with the exception of the dining room at the eastern end, has a distinguishable feature of a double door system. First a double wooden door with adjustable louvers, crowned with a wooden fixed transom with frosted glass panel. Another solid mahogany double door is added, which covers the entire doorway.

The rooms within the elongation are accessed through a 48-foot long, 6-foot wide gallery. The gallery is enclosed in its full length through the use of an original row of wooden balustrade, supporting operable wooden transoms, movable wooden louvers and wooden shutters, simultaneously providing shade and air, two important local design considerations, as Ponce is known for its hot weather and its implacable sun. Another significant design in Casa Vives related to Ponce's climate is the treatment given to the air circulation within the living quarters. The house has high ceilings, ranging from 14 to 15 feet, to give hot air more space to rise. Adorned ventilation holes are strategically located at the four corners of every room's ceiling, allowing for the heat to exit through the roof and letting the cool air circulate throughout the entire house. The fresh air is captured at the roof through a set of brick and masonry ventilation structures, oriented in an east-to-west direction (the usual direction of the wind currents), and channelized to the house interior. Every single room in the house connects to the adjacent room through wooden double doors (some with louvers and shutters, other of solid construction), allowing air to circulate from one space to another. Furthermore, many of the interior doors are crowned with wooden transoms, facilitating the air conduit even with the doors closed. In addition, every single room has, at least, one wooden double door that open toward the exterior.

With the exception of the bathroom, the walls in the house featured diverse surface treatment. Almost every wall is decorated with hand painted and stenciled art recreating geometric patterns and classic motifs: garlands, pilasters, columns and linear designs to accentuate the corners. All floors are of wooden planks made out of tabloncillo (sideroxylon portoricense), with the exception of the gallery's floor, which consist of hydraulic cement tiles, result of an early twentieth century intervention. The ceiling also consists of wooden planks, mostly decorated with hand painted geometric motifs and stenciled designs.

=== Backyard ===
The L-shaped layout of the massive building, together with adjacent constructions, and the surrounding brick and masonry fence, hides to the local transient the open and greenish interior patio of the residence. The patio can be access through the zaguan, the carport, or directly from the upper level eastern end, using a brick and masonry half-turn with landing staircase. As of 2013 the house was vacant, and thus the small urban courtyard-backyard reflects abandonment. However, there are certain built elements within the area that still warrant further description. Most important of these is the marble flared stair, identical to the zaguan staircase (but with one less riser) and the iron grilled gate, which replicates also the zaguan's iron gate. Many early twentieth century Vives' family photos at the patio, using the staircase as stage, suggest the social importance of the location. A water fountain sits at the center of the patio, another favorite spot for early 20th century family photos. There are two separate brick and masonry constructions in a precarious state, currently used as construction material storage area. During the 19th century, the buildings were used as residence for the service personnel.

=== Roof and exterior features ===
The building's roof is accessed through an interior wooden stair. Made of thin bricks, three layers deep, as it was the practice by the 1860s, and surrounded by a three-foot high parapet, the roof contains various elements of architectural interest. First, there are the ventilation structures described previously. In addition, the engineering techniques applied in the design of the roof's drainage speaks well of the craftsman quality at the time. The flat roof slopes slightly towards the western edge, pushing any rainfall into that direction, while, at the same time, at the foot of the parapet, the deck was slightly raised in an arrow shape, dividing the incoming water current and forcing it directly into the drainage holes. The rain fall capture at the roof, according to historic documentation, finds its ways into a well located at the patio.

== Significance ==
=== Craftsmanship ===
Casa Vives is of significance as the property represents a well-preserved example of 19th century craftsmanship, methods and construction techniques. Also the property represents the pattern of urban development applied within many traditional urban centers in Puerto Rico, being the city of Ponce probably its best example. Casa Vives is also significant as it exemplifies the social aspirations and class-representation of the nineteenth century upper echelons and their impact in the built landscape.

=== Commercial context ===
Casa Vives is associated with and represents Ponce's 19th century urban development. Just a small settlement consisting of one 115 houses and 5,038 people scattered around a small plaza with a little deteriorated church at the center by the late 18th century, by 1878 Ponce's urban center projected a striving city with four squares, an urban grid with 34 major streets, 1,084, 260 huts and 2,204 families co-existing within the urban core. Around the same year, the municipality of Ponce consisted of five urban wards, numerically named as sectors 1, 2, 3, 4 and 5; the urban wards of La Playa and Cantera and 21 rural wards. Within the urban core, excluding public buildings and huts, there were 973 residences: fifty-three two-story brick and masonry houses; 101 houses of just one level of the same material; thirty-three two-story houses of mixed construction (masonry at the lower level with a wooden upper floor); thirty-seven two-story wooden houses and 742 one-story wooden houses.

The boom in Ponce's urban development was tied to the city's agricultural and commercial activity. During the first decades of the 19th century, Puerto Rico's agricultural production became more important than its military strategic location within the Caribbean. As foreign trade became significant, so did cities with port facilities. Ponce took great advantage of its location in the southern portion of the island and its most adequate port facilities, officially opened at La Playa by 1804. The city was able to capitalize on its distant location from San Juan, channelizing not only its own local production, but also absorbing the production of adjacent municipalities and becoming the main center in the island's international market, replacing San Juan as head of the exporting commerce. In 1890, Ponce was responsible for the exportation of 33.2% of the island's production, while San Juan accounted for 21.2 percent.

Ponce's economic strength was also the result of the city becoming the home base of a very influential immigration. Events like the Haitian Revolution (1789–1804), the Latin American Wars of Independence (1810–1824), and the Spanish government immigrants policies (like the 1815 Real Cedula de Gracia) promoted the arrival of numerous well-to-do foreign citizens that made out of Ponce's fertile flatlands their new production centers (specially sugarcane) and turned Ponce's urban center into their new homes. Don Salvador de Vives, founder of the Vives dynasty in the island and the well-known Hacienda Buena Vista, arrived in Ponce in 1821, from Venezuela, with his wife, his young son, Carlos Vives, future owner of Casa Vives, and two slaves, as part of this human exodus.

Ponce's agricultural economy and commerce gravitated around two main crops: sugar and coffee. The sugar industry will bring its collateral consequences: the establishment of a social framework based on slavery. In Ponce, more than any other region of the island, sugar and slavery were synonymous. By the time Salvador Vives died in 1845, after being city mayor three consecutive terms, slaves constituted 11% of the population of the island as a whole; in Ponce, they made up 23% of the population. As an example, slaves provided the main workforce at Vives's Hacienda Buena Vista.

The slave commerce, as the sugar, coffee and other crops produced within the southern region and mostly exported through Ponce, promoted the formation of a strong commercial sector, just as dominant as the powerful landlord class. Through their commercial relationships, social interaction and marriage arrangements, these upper groups conformed an urban bourgeoisie that shaped Ponce's urban landscape. According to Carlos A. Rubio Cancela of the Puerto Rico Historical Preservation Office, "the words used by historian Frank Moya Pons to describe the new urban centers in the Dominican Republic could be properly applied to Ponce's development by 19th century: 'new buildings were erected, light systems were installed, the streets were paved and provided with sewage and aqueducts, social clubs and literary societies were founded and theaters and plazas were built'. As architect Jorge Rigau indicates, "The vigorous commercial activity ... introduced an urban lifestyle previously unknown." The striving commercial activity in the city attracted businessmen, landlords, and speculators into the urban core, but it also attracted carpenters, artisans, brick layers, contractors, architects, engineers, artists, and many others from which the city's landscape would grow and benefit.

Through the intensive use of agriculture and its equally intensive port commerce, Ponce became the richest municipality in the island. By 1890, with 70 municipalities already formed, Ponce was the town that most contributed in taxes to the state treasury.

=== Social context ===
Casa Vives occupies a prominent corner lot at the intersection of two major commercial streets in Ponce. Its neoclassical design reflected the social and economic status of its owner and distinguished the residence from other affluent homes in the city. The house has also been described as an important example of domestic architecture associated with Ponce's wealthy social class.

== Effects of the 2020 Puerto Rico earthquake ==
The building sustained significant damage in January 2020 from the 2020 Puerto Rico earthquake.
