= Juan Bertoli Calderoni =

Puerto Rican architect (1820–1885)

- Juan Bertoly Calderoni
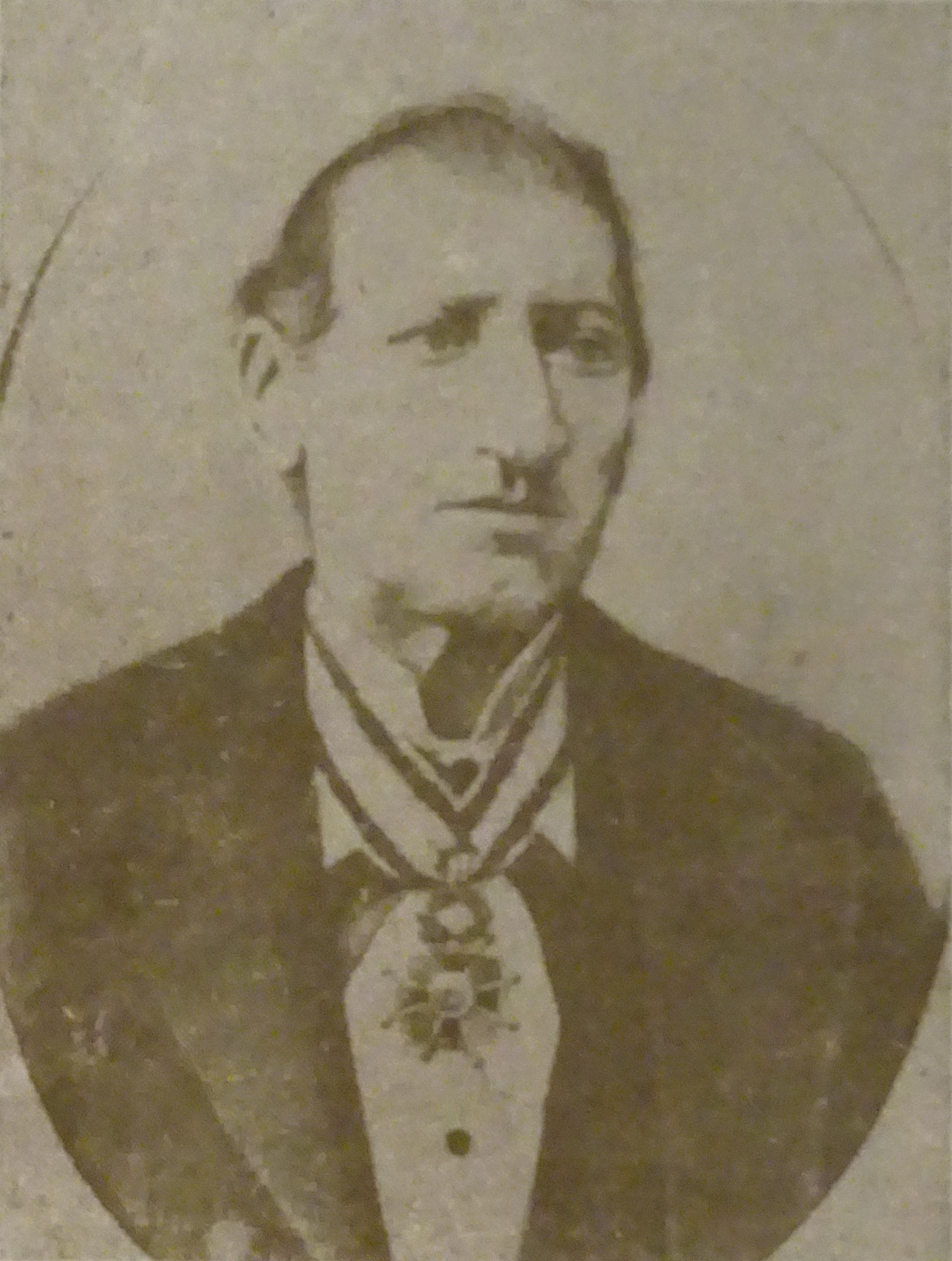
- Juan Bertoli Calderoni, ca 1880
- Born: 1820; Bastia, Corsica, France (Note: There is uncertainty as to where Bertoli Calderoni was born. While some sources state he was born in Carrara, Italy (crediting Carrara, Italy, see, for example, Museo de la Historia de Ponce, Ponce, Puerto Rico, Architecture Wing, Architects Display, and Eli D. Oquendo-Rodriguez in A Orillas del Mar Caribe: Boceto historico de la Playa de Ponce - Desde sus primeros habitantes hasta principios del siglo XX, 2017, Editorial Akelarre, page 59.), other sources state he was born in Bastia, Corsica, France (crediting Bastia, Corsica, France, see, for example, Encyclopedia Puerto Rico..) Either way, he was a long time resident of Ponce, Puerto Rico.)
- Died: 12 June 1885; Ponce, Puerto Rico
- Resting place: Panteon Nacional Roman Baldorioty de Castro
- Known for: Engineering, Architect
- Notable work: Teatro La Perla, Museo de la Música Puertorriqueña, Centro Cultural de Ponce, Casa Vives
- Movement: Neoclassical architecture

Juan Bertoli Calderoni (sometimes spelled Juan Bertoly Calderoni) was a nineteenth-century French (Note: There is uncertainty as to where Bertoli Calderoni was born. While some sources state he was born in Carrara, Italy (crediting Carrara, Italy, see, for example, Museo de la Historia de Ponce, Ponce, Puerto Rico, Architecture Wing, Architects Display), other sources state he was born in Bastia, Corsica, France (crediting Bastia, Corsica, France, see, for example, Encyclopedia Puerto Rico.) Either way, he was a long time resident of Ponce, Puerto Rico.) architect from Bastia, Corsica, and long-time resident of Ponce, Puerto Rico, where he designed various prominent structures including Teatro La Perla, Casa Serrallés (now, Museo de la Música Puertorriqueña), and Residencia Ermelindo Salazar (now, Centro Cultural de Ponce, at Calle Cristina #70) among various other historic building.

== First years ==
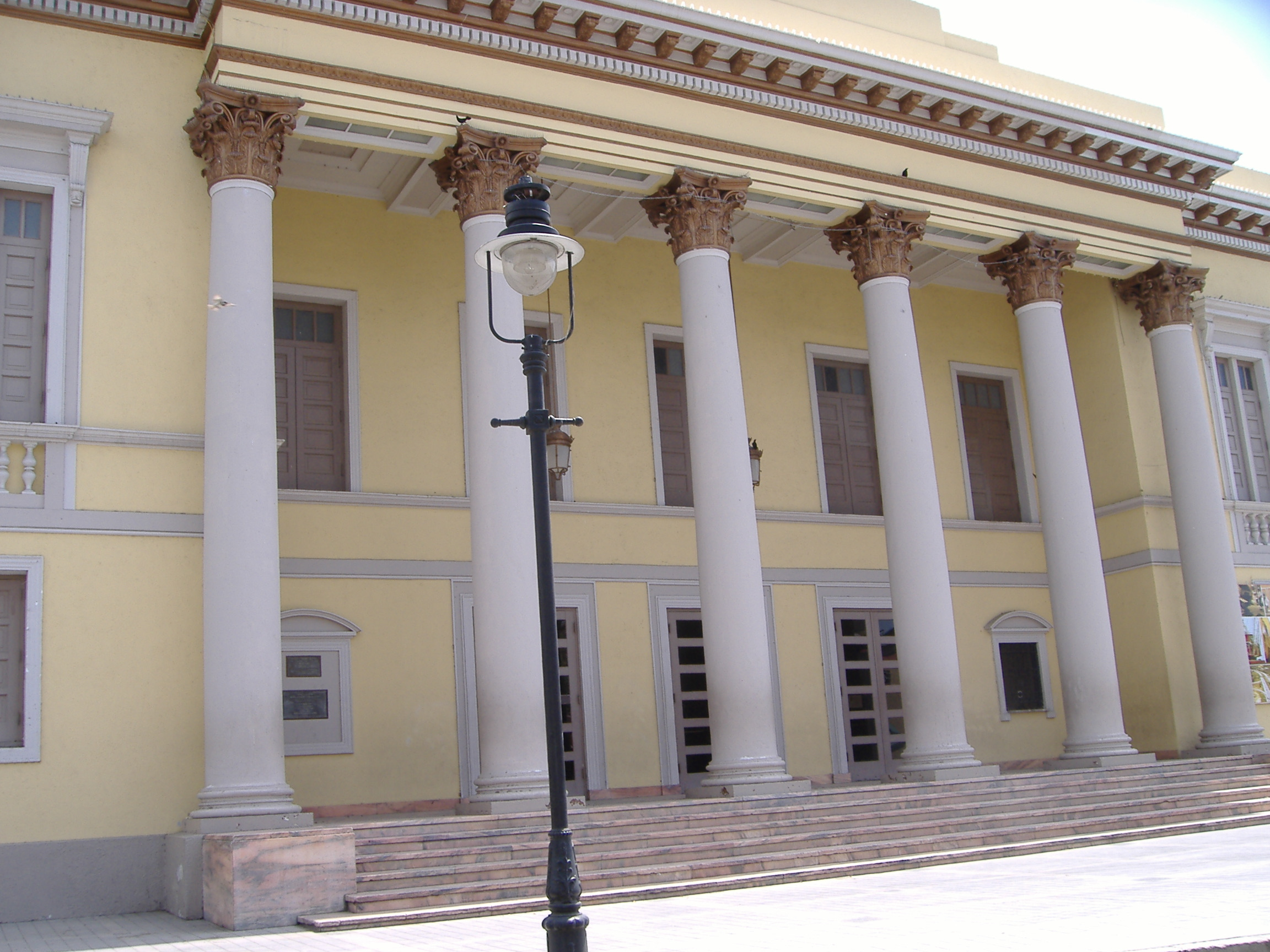
Teatro La Perla, one of Bertoli's structures

Bertoli Calderoni was the son of Juan Ludovico Bertoli and Maria Luisa Calderoni. He came to Puerto Rico from Bastia, Corsica, in 1845, contracted by the Spanish Military Corps of Engineers to work at La Fortaleza and other Spanish military installations in San Juan. Subsequently, he moved to Ponce, Puerto Rico, seeking better recognition for his skills. In Ponce, he designed and directed the building of Teatro La Perla, the first neoclassical construction in Ponce.

== Legacy ==
Among Bertoli's most distinguished works is the Teatro La Perla (1860s). He also designed the former downtown Ponce residence of the Ermelindo Salazar (1870) at 70 Cristina street. The latter was originally built as the residence of prominent Ponce businessman and subsequent Ponce mayor, Ermelindo Salazar; it was also the first headquarters of Museo de Arte de Ponce, and today is home to the Centro Cultural de Ponce. He also designed Casa Vives, the home of the owner of Hacienda Buena Vista.

== Honors ==
- Bertoli is recognized at Ponce's Park of the Illustrious Ponce Citizens.
- In Barrio Segundo, Ponce, there is a street named after him; the street leads to Castillo Serralles.

== See also ==
- Alfredo Wiechers
- Francisco Porrata Doria
