= Ponce Plaza Hotel & Casino =

Hotel in Ponce, Puerto Rico

- Hotel Ramada de Ponce (Spanish)
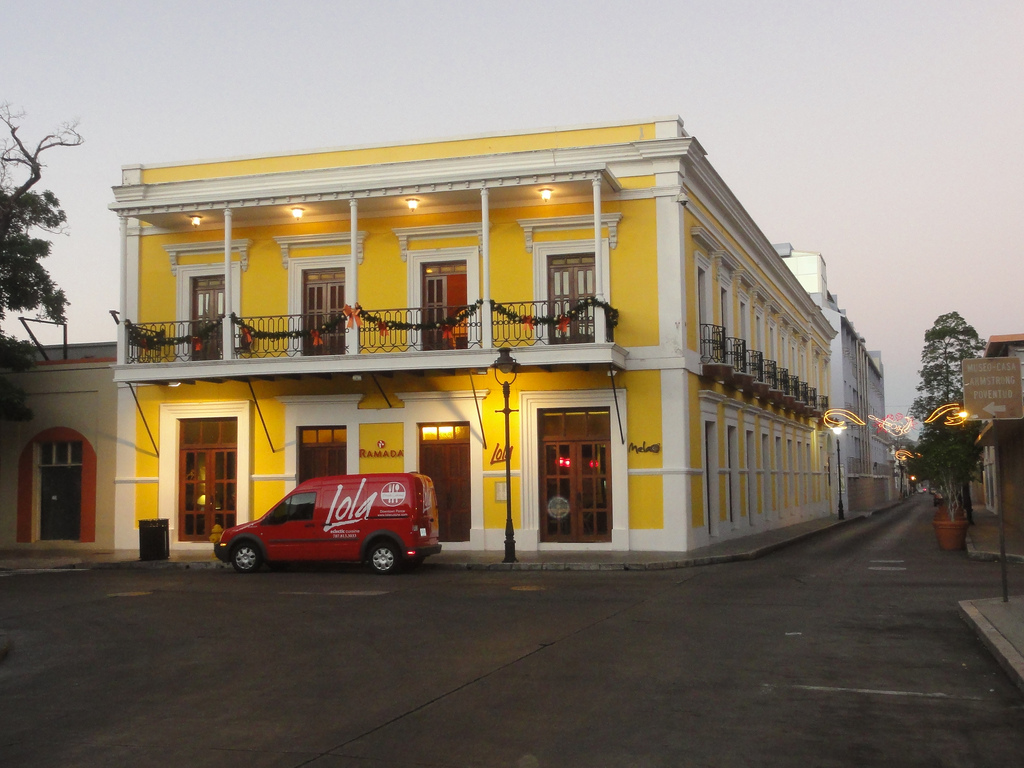
- Historic Casa Sauri converted into the Ponce Ramada Hotel, located at Plaza Muñoz Rivera, Ponce

- Location within Puerto Rico

General information
- Location: Calle Union and Calle Reina (Facing Plaza Muñoz Rivera); Ponce, Puerto Rico
- Coordinates: 18°0′43.6″N 66°36′52.8″W
- Opening: 2 July 2009
- Cost: US$15 million, plus US$22 million (2013 expansion)
- Owner: Ramada, Wyndham Worldwide; Key Personnel: Antonio Muñoz Bermúdez, CEO Ramón Antonio Bermúdez Grajales, GM
- Operator: Muñoz Bermúdez Holdings Inc.

Technical details
- Floor count: 4

Design and construction
- Architects: Bonnin Orozco Arquitectos (BO2A): Fernando R. Bonnín Orozco and Javier L. Bonnín Orozco
- Developer: Muñoz Bermúdez Holdings Inc.

Other information
- Number of rooms: 70
- Number of suites: 6
- Number of restaurants: 2
- Parking: 224

Website
- Ponce Plaza Hotel and Casino

The Ponce Plaza Hotel & Casino, formerly Ponce Ramada Hotel and Ponce Plaza Ramada Hotel, is a five-story hotel in Ponce, Puerto Rico. The hotel opened in the summer of 2009 and is known for the historic value of its structure: its main entrance is a historic colonial structure known as "Casa Saurí" (Saurí House). In February 2013, the hotel expanded its facilities to include a casino, a cocktail lounge, and a 4-story, 200-car parking garage. On 1 July 2014, the owners left the Ramada namesake franchise and renamed the hotel Ponce Plaza Hotel & Casino.

== Location and features ==
The hotel is located in the Ponce Historic Zone. It has two major buildings. The first building, facing Plaza Muñoz Rivera, is the historic Casa Saurí structure and houses six colonial-style rooms, as well as the hotel's Lola Eclectic Cuisine restaurant. The rear building, located on the southeast corner of Calle Reina and Calle Mendez Vigo, is a modern four-story structure housing 64 additional guest rooms, as well as an indoor parking garage on the first floor and a fitness center on the fourth floor. There is also an outdoor swimming pool.

== Design ==
The hotel was designed in 2006-2009 by architects Fernando Bonnín and Javier Bonnín of Ponce, Puerto Rico.

== History ==
The historic 1882 Casa Saurí-Rubert was meticulously rebuilt to accommodate the hotel." On the first floor of this Casa Saurí building the hotel now houses its front desk, lobby, conference room/breakfast room, and restaurant. The second floor accommodates six colonial-style guest rooms. These six rooms are all designed to follow 19th century historic themes. The hotel was built with incentives under Law 212 of the Commonwealth. Félix Sauri y Vivas was a Ponce businessman and hacienda holder and mayor of Ponce in 1895. Casa Sauri is said to be the third oldest residence still standing in Ponce.

== Re-construction ==
Munoz Holdings invested $15 million in the restoration and development of the original Casa Sauri property and development of the hotel's modern 5-story tower.

== Expansion ==
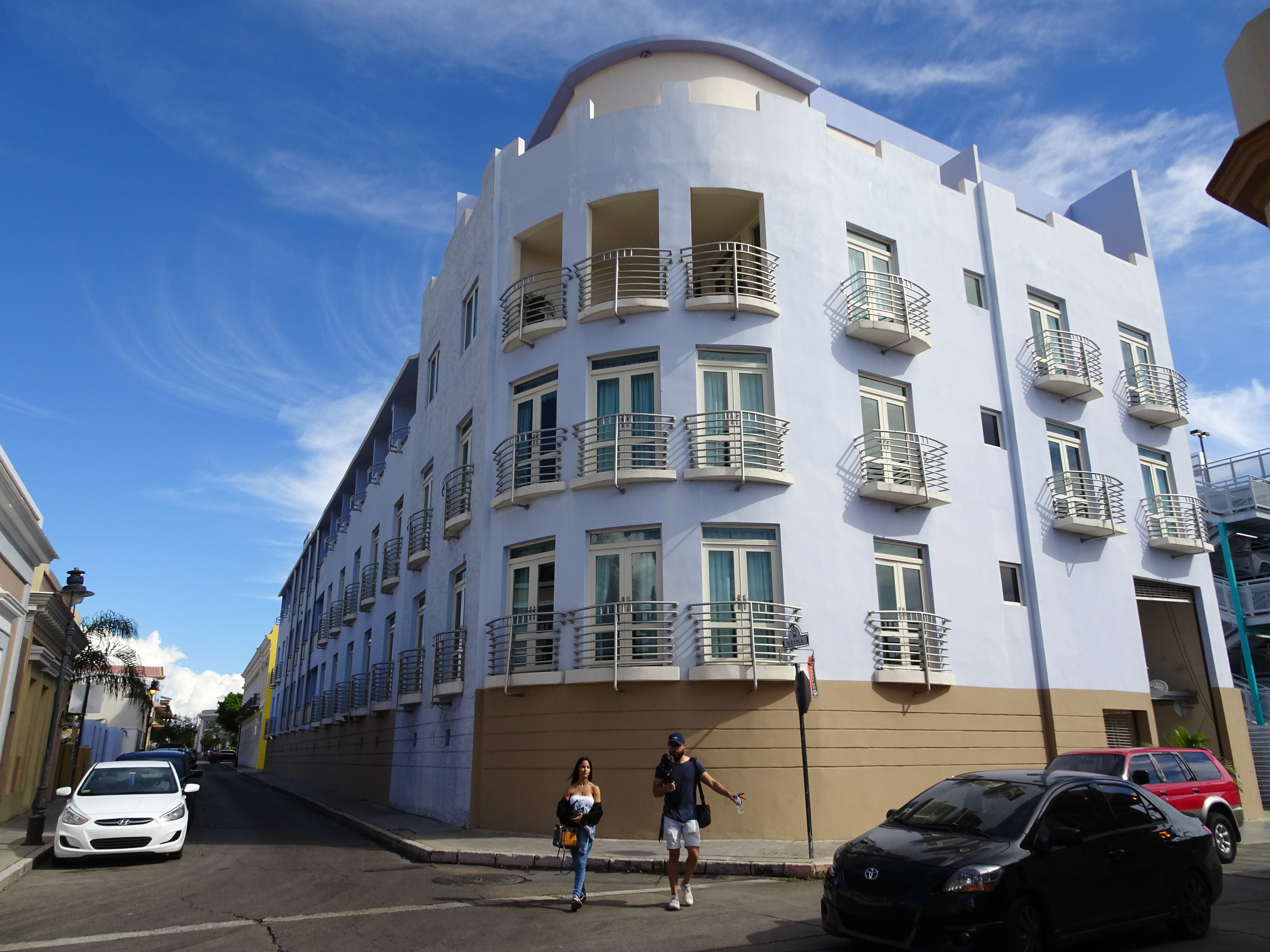
Western end of the hotel

In August 2011, hotel owners announced plans to enlarge the hotel with the addition of a casino, a large conference room, a second restaurant, and 150 additional parking spaces. The plans called for the development of the property immediately to the south of the current historic Casa Saurí, a property which also faces Plaza Muñoz Rivera. The new casino would boast 9,500 square feet of space, and the new conference rooms would be able to accommodate 200 people in a space of 6,000 square feet. The planned parking garage opened two years later, in 2013. The casino opened in February 2013, together with the 4-story, 200-car parking garage.

== See also ==
- History of the Autonomous City of Ponce
- List of hotels in Puerto Rico
- List of casinos in Puerto Rico
