= Centro Cultural Carmen Solá de Pereira de Ponce =

Cultural center of the city of Ponce in Puerto Rico

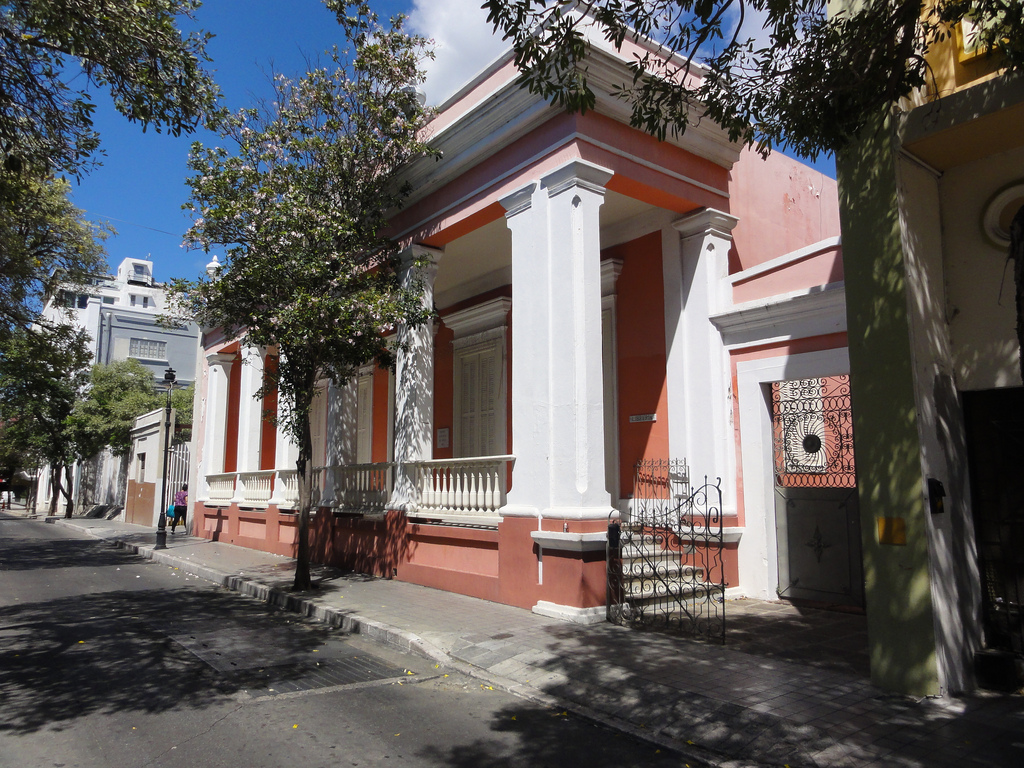
- Centro Cultural de Ponce Carmen Solá de Pereira in Barrio Tercero, Ponce, Puerto Rico
- Formation: 12 November 1963
- Type: Government-owned corporation
- Legal status: Statutory
- Purpose: Educational & Cultural development
- Headquarters: 70 Cristina Street
- Location: Ponce, Puerto Rico
- Coordinates: 18.01197°N 66.61259°W
- Region served: Porta Caribe
- Members: Free
- Official language: Spanish
- President: Milagros Quiñones (2012– incumbent)
- Key people: Presidents: Helvetia Nicole (1963–65); Ariel Colón Clavell (1965–75); Héctor García (1975–81); Héctor Méndez Loucil (1981–86); Antonia Santiago (1986–95); Julio Rodríguez (1995–97); Héctor Estrada (1997-01); Iraida Muñiz (2001–03); Pedro Santiago (2003–04); Carmen Santiago (2004–07); José Balay Ruiz (2007–12) Iris Torres (? - Now)
- Parent organization: Institute of Puerto Rican Culture
- Budget: Not available
- Staff: 3
- Volunteers: Not available
- Remarks: Owner: Government of Puerto Rico

Centro Cultural Carmen Solá de Pereira de Ponce (English: Carmen Solá de Pereira Ponce Cultural Center) is the cultural center of the city of Ponce, and is located at 70 Cristina street in the Ponce Historic Zone, in Barrio Tercero, Ponce, Puerto Rico. The Center is located in a structure designed in 1870, and it is currently used for educational and cultural activities as well as for art exhibits. Centro Cultural de Ponce was founded on 12 November 1963.

== History ==
Founded in 1963 by Judith Rodríguez Mirailh and Helvetia Nicole, the organization was originally called La Casa de la Cultura (The House of Culture). Since its founding, Centro Cultural has been "actively promoting the artistic development on [Ponce]’s rich educational and intellectual environment", including the Noches de Galería, "where renowned as well as promising painters, artisans and sculptors exhibit their works and showcase their talent." The Centro Cultural de Ponce has occupied the structure at 70 Cristina Street since 1996. Prior to that its members met at members' homes and similar venues.

== Offerings ==
Among the Center's offerings are "Noches de Galería" during which the organization shows off artistic rendering by Ponceños and Puerto Ricans in general. Over 75 of these have taken place on a monthly basis since their inception. This offering started under the leadership of then Centro president and painter José Balay Ruiz. Centro Cultural also organizes and directs the yearly Feria de Artesanías de Ponce, which take place at Plaza Las Delicias every year during the month of April.

== Structure ==
The structure, located at 18° 0' 44.244" N, 66° 36' 39.9528" W, was designed in 1870 by the Corsican architect Juan Bertoli Calderoni. Its style incorporates elements of Colonial Spanish and Ponce Creole architecture. Its courtyard is surrounded by a gallery. The building was originally built as the former home of Ermelindo Salazar, a prominent landowner, merchant, banker, as well as mayor of Ponce in 1880. In 1959 the building became the first home of the Museo de Arte de Ponce. Museo de Arte de Ponce moved to its current facility on Avenida Las Americas in 1965, vacating the structure at 70 Cristina Street. In 1990, the Instituto de Cultura Puertorriqueña restored the structure to house the first headquarters of the Museo de la Música Puertorriqueña. The house has the distinction of being the first one in the city to be served by a private telephone line. The line exclusively communicated the owners’ family residence with their commercial offices at the Ponce port. This was 17 years before the service finally arrived to the rest of the City.

== Carmen Solá de Pereira ==
The Center was named after Carmen Solá de Pereira, an outstanding educator and a representative from Ponce at the Puerto Rico Legislative Assembly. Solá de Pereira dedicated her life to the education of disadvantaged children. She was a teacher and school principal in La Cantera, an underprivileged community in Ponce, Puerto Rico.

== Presidents ==
- Helvetia Nicole (1963–1965)
- Ariel Colón Clavell (1965–1975)
- Héctor García (1975–1981)
- Héctor Méndez Loucil(1981–1986)
- Antonia Santiago (1986–1995)
- Julio Rodríguez (1995–1997)
- Héctor Estrada (1997–2001)
- Liarda Muñiz (2001–2003)
- Pedro Santiago (2003–2004)
- Carmen Santiago (2004–2007)
- José Balay (2007–2012)
- Iris Torres ( - Incumbent)

== See also ==
- Residencia Ermelindo Salazar
- Instituto de Cultura Puertorriqueña
