= Ponce Historic Zone =

Historic area in Ponce, Puerto Rico

Ponce Historic Zone Zona Histórica de Ponce
- Historic district
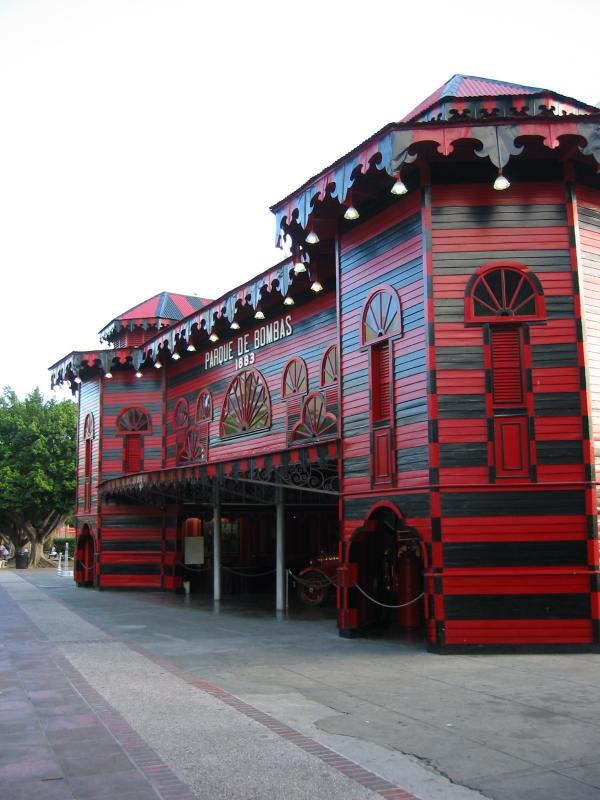
- Parque de Bombas, an iconic symbol of the Historic Zone
- Nickname: La Perla del Sur
- Motto: Ponce es Ponce
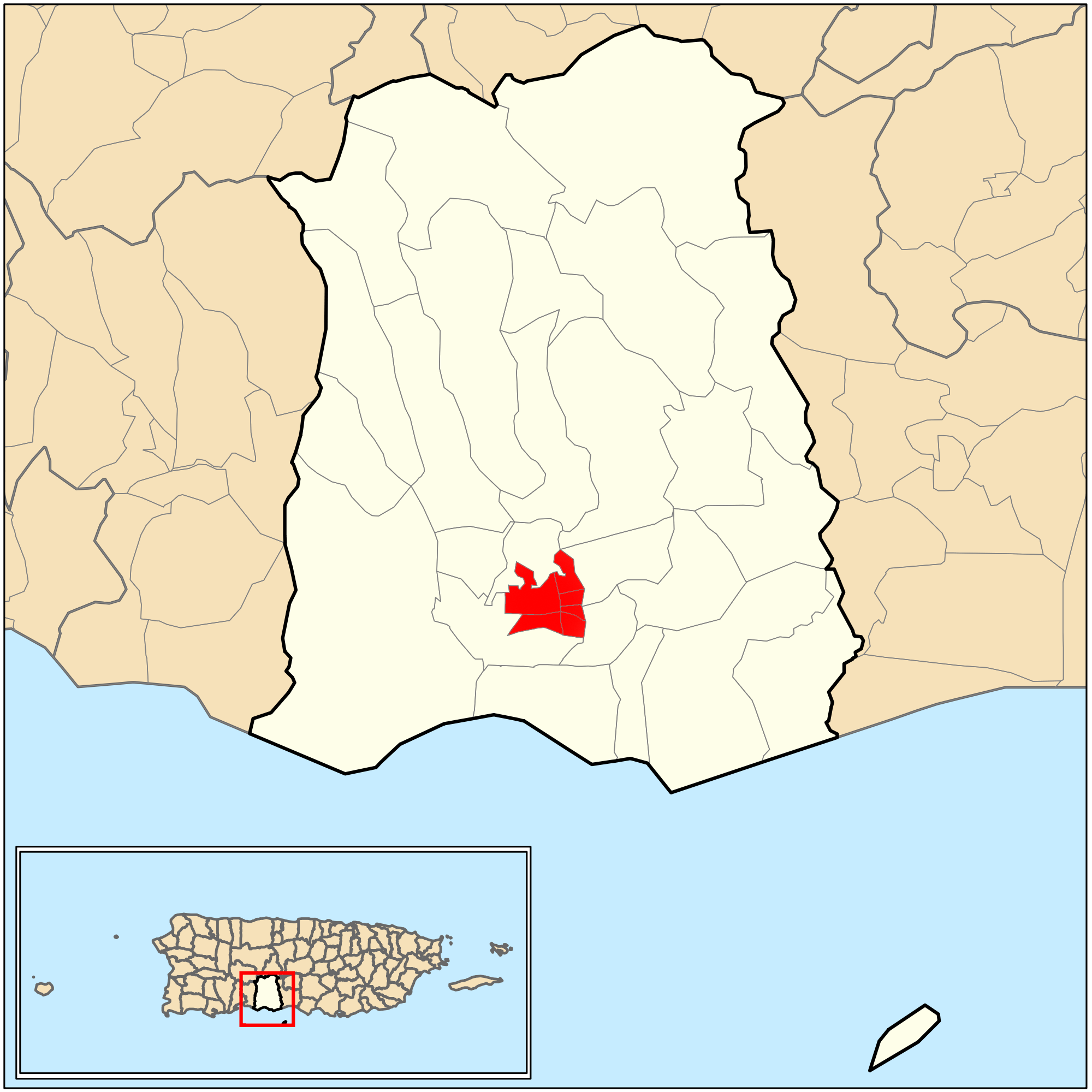
- Map of the Historic Zone within the municipality of Ponce
- Coordinates: 18°00′41.6874″N 66°36′50.22″W
- Commonwealth: Puerto Rico
- Municipality: Ponce
- Established: 1646
- Founded: 1692
- Designated Historic Zone: 1989
- Barrios: Primero, Segundo, Tercero, Cuarto, Quinto, and Sexto

The Ponce Historic Zone (Spanish: Zona Histórica de Ponce) is a historic district in downtown Ponce, Puerto Rico, consisting of buildings, plazas and structures with distinctive architectures such as Neoclásico Isabelino and the Ponce Creole, a local architectural style developed between the 19th- and early 20th-centuries. The zone goes by various names, including Traditional Ponce (Ponce Tradicional), Central Ponce (Ponce Centro), Historic Ponce (Ponce Histórico), and Ponce Historic District (Distrito Histórico de Ponce). Although not yet listed in the National Register of Historic Places, the Ponce Historic Zone was added to the Puerto Rico Register of Historic Sites and Zones (Registro Nacional de Sitios y Zonas Históricas) on February 2, 1989.

== Location ==
The historic zone is located in what is commonly called Ponce Pueblo – the central downtown and oldest area of the city. While there are several roads that lead to it, the most common point of entry is via PR-1, which becomes the Miguel Pou Boulevard, and then into the one-way Isabel Street, leading to the center of Ponce at the Plaza Las Delicias.

In addition to Plaza Las Delicias, with its unique Parque de Bombas and Nuestra Señora de la Guadalupe Cathedral, the zone includes landmarks such as Ponce City Hall, Armstrong-Poventud Residence, Ponce High School, and Panteón Nacional Román Baldorioty de Castro. Numerous other attractions in this historic area are listed in the NRHP, such as Banco de Ponce, Casa Paoli, and Casa de la Masacre. Others, such as Teatro Fox Delicias, Teatro La Perla, Plaza de Mercado, Hotel Meliá, and Paseo Atocha are not listed but possess significant historical value. Street corners in most of this zone have chamfered corners (esquinas de chaflán), typical of Barcelona, Spain.

A map of the area covered by the Ponce Historic Zone is available (in 2011) from the government of the municipality of Ponce.

== History ==
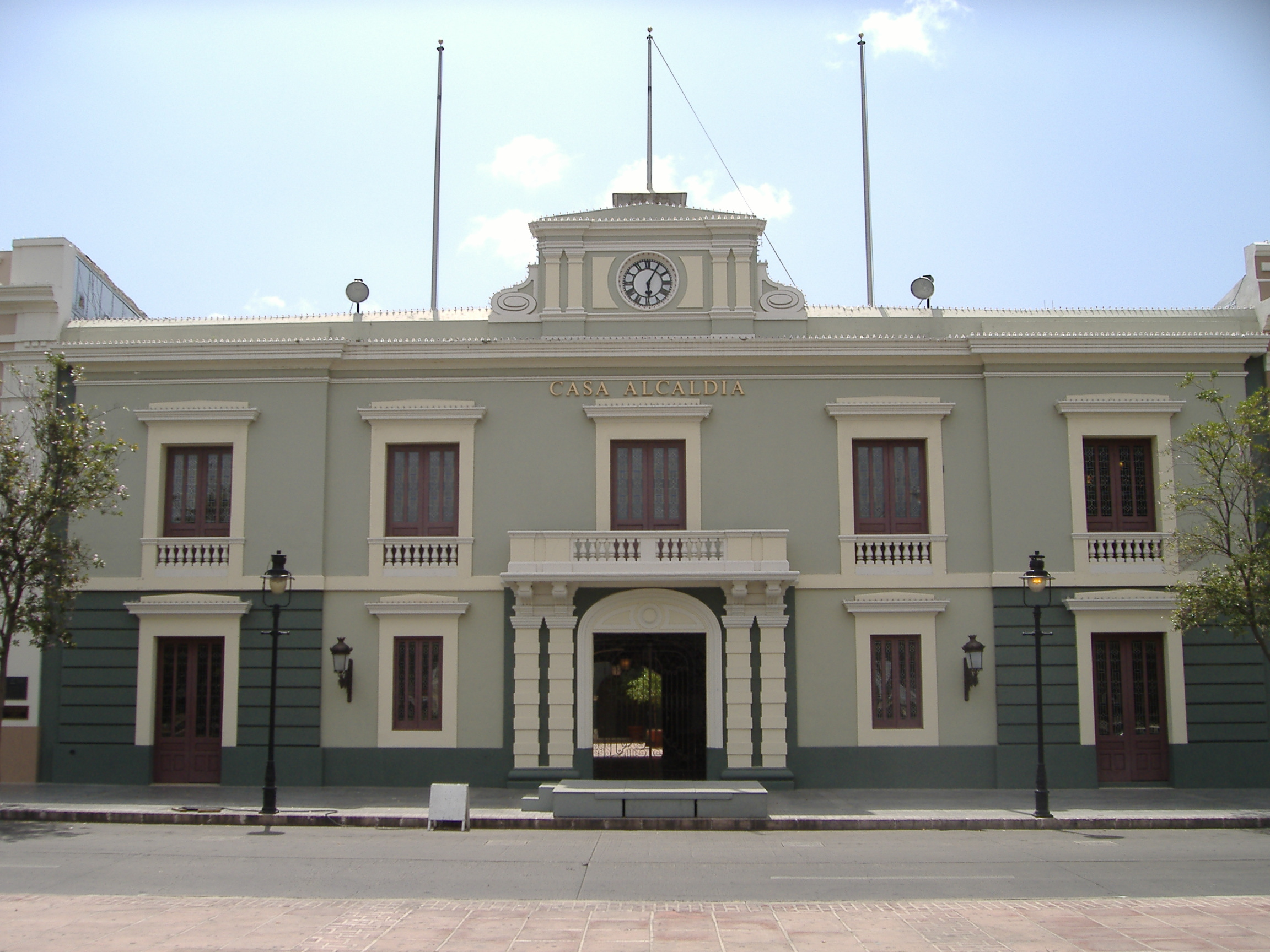
The Ponce City Hall, or Casa Alcaldia de Ponce, built in the 1840s, is the oldest colonial building in the city.

Carmelo Rosario Natal has linked the origins of the Ponce Historic Zone to an event that took place on 8 June 1893. On that date, La Gaceta de Puerto Rico, the insular government's official periodical, published an edict of the Governor of Puerto Rico, Antonio Daban y Ramirez de Arellano, that mandated municipal authorities throughout the Island to divide, for fire control purposes, a town's urban center into three zones: stone-built, build with fire resistant materials, and built with combustible materials. No structure could be built, rebuilt or restored within a minimum of 50 meters from the town's central square unless it was stoned-built or it was to be upgraded to a stone-built structure. According to Rosario Natal, those were the roots of what almost 70 years later would be called the Ponce Historic Zone. On 20 June 1960, governor Luis Muñoz Marín amended the law regarding historic zones, making it possible for Ponce to be included in such category. On 6 June 1962, the Zone was officially designated as such, and initially included only the center core of the city, but it was later expanded to include a much larger area. On that date (6 June 1962) the Instituto de Cultura Puertorriqueña, with the concurrence of the Puerto Rico Planning Board, approved a resolution creating the Zone. The Zone included a list of 22, mostly contiguous areas, including specific buildings, structures, plaza, streets and sectors that were to be preserved. It also included an area in barrio Playa, including the ruins of the old Fuerte de San José.

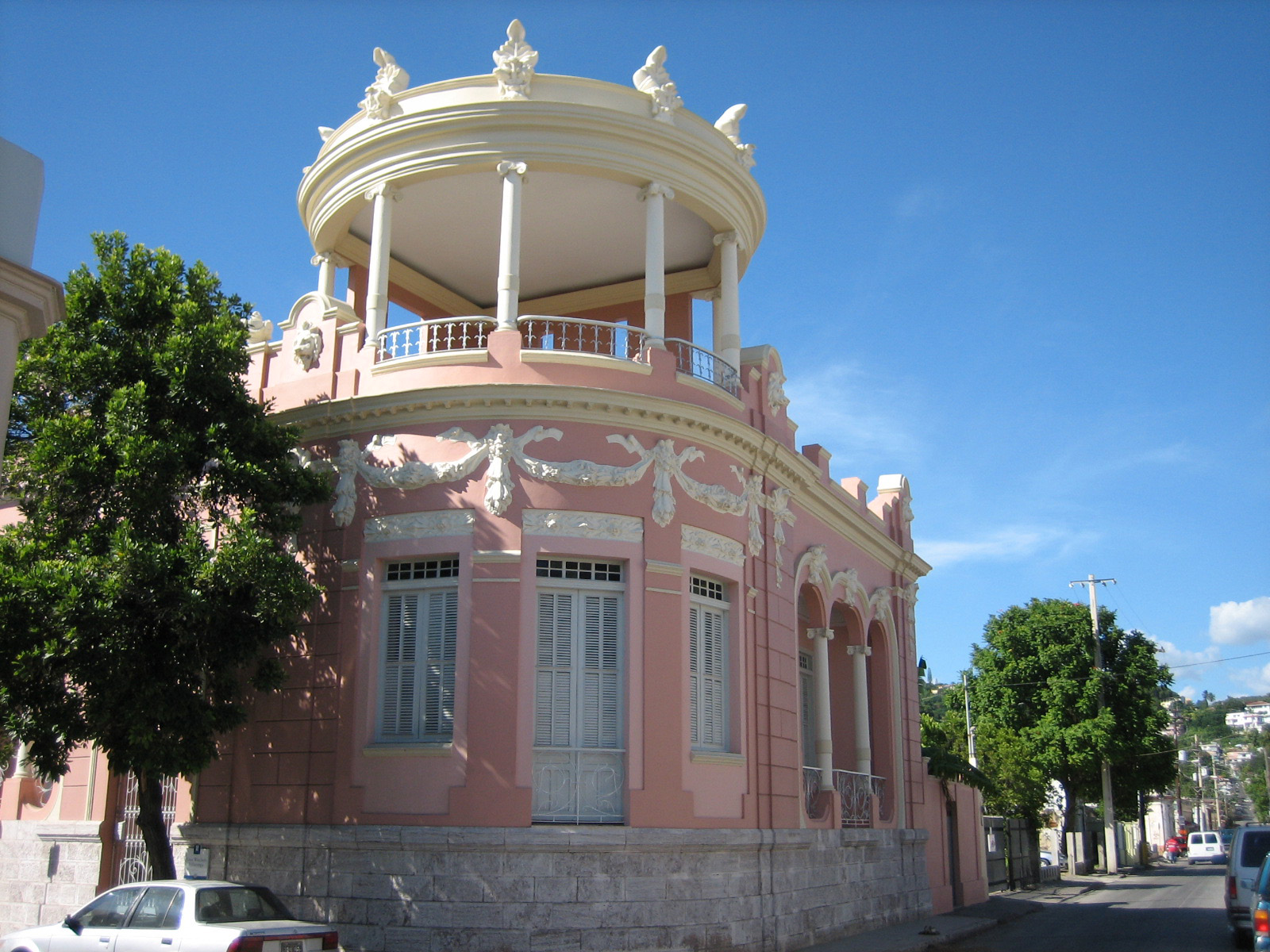
The 1912 Casa Wiechers-Villaronga, housing the Museo de la Arquitectura Ponceña

It was not long before the creation of the Zone was opposed by local developers and the real estate service industry. Ismaro Torruella, president of the Municipal Assembly, who was originally one of the supporters of the creation of the Zone, succumbed to mounting pressure from local developers, business people and realtors and, by 1962, now favored the elimination, or at least the limitation, of the Zone. "The evidence on this matter is clear. Torruella and his colleagues wanted to make sure the public hearing [of 10 March 1965] was controlled by them." Opposing groups sought to make their voices known to the townspeople at large, not just to the Municipal Government and the ICP, and formed "Comite de Ciudadanos para el Progreso de Ponce" (Citizens Committee Ponce's Progress). This committee included prominent businessmen such as Juan Eugenio Candal, Jose Maria Rovira, Gustavo Armstrong, Jose Moscoso, Tito Castro, among several others. To counter this group, supporters of the Historic Zone created their own "Comite Ponceño Pro Buen Progreso" (Ponce Citizens' Committee for Fair Progress)." The debates went on for years with many public hearings taking place. Professional urban planning, traffic, and architectural studies, among others, also took place and recommendations were provided. One study categorized the architectural styles in the Historic Zone into seven groups: Neoclassical European, Spanish Colonial, Ponce Creole, Criollo Pueblerino, Criollo Residencial Pueblerino, Neoclassical Creole, and Neoclassical Superior.

On 17 November 2005, then-Governor of Puerto Rico, Aníbal Acevedo Vilá, signed Executive Order Number 72, approving the historic Ponce center as a Historic Center of First Order.

== Plan Ponce en Marcha ==
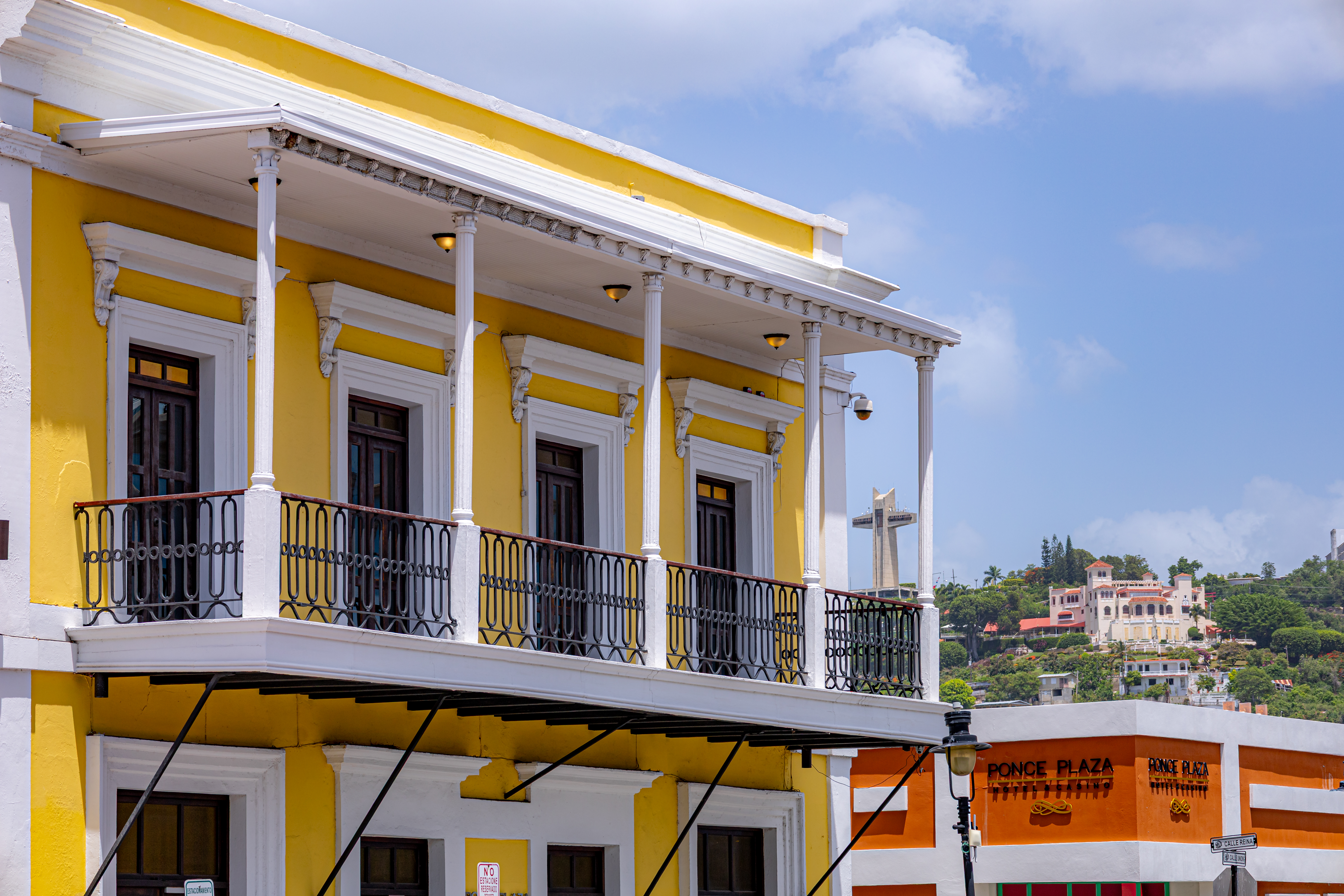
Ponce Plaza Hotel with Cruceta del Vigía and Castillo Serrallés in the background

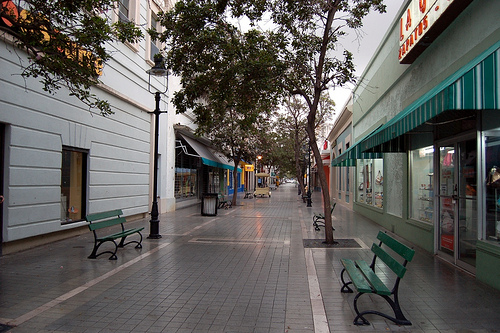
Paseo Atocha

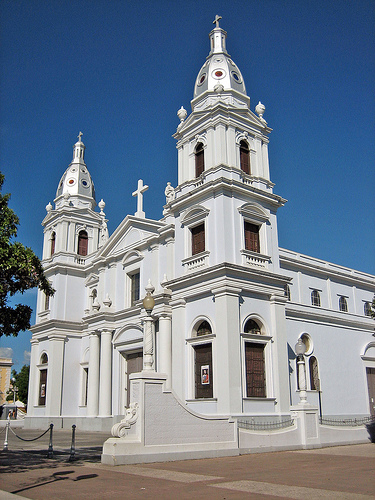
Cathedral Nuestra Señora de la Guadalupe was rebuilt in more splendor after the 1918 San Fermín earthquake

In the 1990s an intensive $440 million revitalization project called "Plan Ponce en Marcha" ("Ponce on the Move Plan") has increased the city's historic area from 260 to 1,046 buildings. The Ponce en Marcha project was conceived in 1985 by then governor Rafael Hernández Colón during his second term in La Fortaleza. A significant number of buildings in Ponce are listed in the National Register of Historic Places. The nonprofit Project for Public Places listed the historic downtown Ponce city center as one of the 60 of the World's Great Places, for its "graciously preserved showcase of Caribbean culture". The Ponce en Marcha project has given even more form to the definition, establishment, and development of the Ponce Historic Zone. The plan is the result of litigation between the Government of the Autonomous Municipality of Ponce and the Government of Puerto Rico.

The Ponce en Marcha plan projects involve several departments of the Government of Puerto Rico:

- The Puerto Rico Departamento de la Vivienda must complete the "Riberas del Bucaná III" residential project, and rehabilitate housing in the Baldorioty, La Ponderosa, and Lomas de Guaraguao sectors. It must rehabilitate the homes in the Puerto Viejo sector in barrio Playa plus 200 units of uninhabited lots citywide, restart the program "Tu Ciudad Renace", and demolish the housing project "Residencial Las Terrazas".
- The Puerto Rico Autoridad de Carreteras must comply with the construction of the bridge at the intersection of PR-2 and Punto Oro, the two projects required to complete the Anillo de Circunvalación de Ponce, and three bridges over Avenida Maruca.
- The Puerto Rico Autoridad de Edificios Públicos, must swap land belonging to the Puerto Rico Police Marine Unit in exchange for improvements to "Parque Julio González", and must complete the construction of the Ponce Headquarters of the Puerto Rico Police.
- The Puerto Rico Autoridad de Energía Eléctrica must complete Phase III of the burial of aerial cabling within the "Zona Histórica", as well as Phase VI.
- The Puerto Rico Autoridad de Acueductos Alcantarillados must complete the design of the water filtration plant at barrio Cerrillos, the acquisition of land for its construction and its distribution network.
- The Puerto Rico Autoridad de los Puertos must expand the runway and taxiway at Mercedita Airport and build the maintenance building.
- The Puerto Rico Departamento de Recursos Naturales must comply with the construction of the Portugués and Bucaná rivers lineal park, as well as the canalization of the Matilde, Pastillo y Canas rivers and the development of the La Matilde Natural Reserve and the Caja de Muertos Light.

=== Designation categories ===
Structures within the historic zone are classified into four categories:

- The first consists of structures "with a monumental historic value", and part of the city's heritage.
- The second is for those structures that while lacking a monumental historic value, possess some qualities of historic, architectural, or cultural interest.
- The third category includes those structures of contextual value. These are those structures that may not intrinsically possess historic, architectural, or cultural value individually, but do enhance the area when they are considered contextually, as part of a larger group, as part of urban characteristic, or as part of the architecture of a section of a street.
- And finally, category 4 is reserved for those structures that exist within the historic zone but whose value has not been assessed, that is, they are unclassified.

=== Sub-zones ===
The historic zone itself consists of three distinct sub-zones:

- First Order Zone – This zone is limited to the area immediately surrounding Plaza Las Delicias. This is the original historic zone, created in 1962.
- Second Order Zone – This is a zone that was added in 1989 further increasing the perimeter of the area around Plaza Las Delicias.
- Third Order Zone – This zone was added in 1992, and it covered the communities of Mariani, Belgica, and parts of Clausells, and Cantera. It was also extended, for the first time, east of Rio Portugues, to cover the community of La Alhambra.

In August 2003, Mayor Cordero favored a measure to exclude Belgica, Claussells, and Cantera — all poor, low-income communities — from the historic zone.

== Landmarks and attractions ==
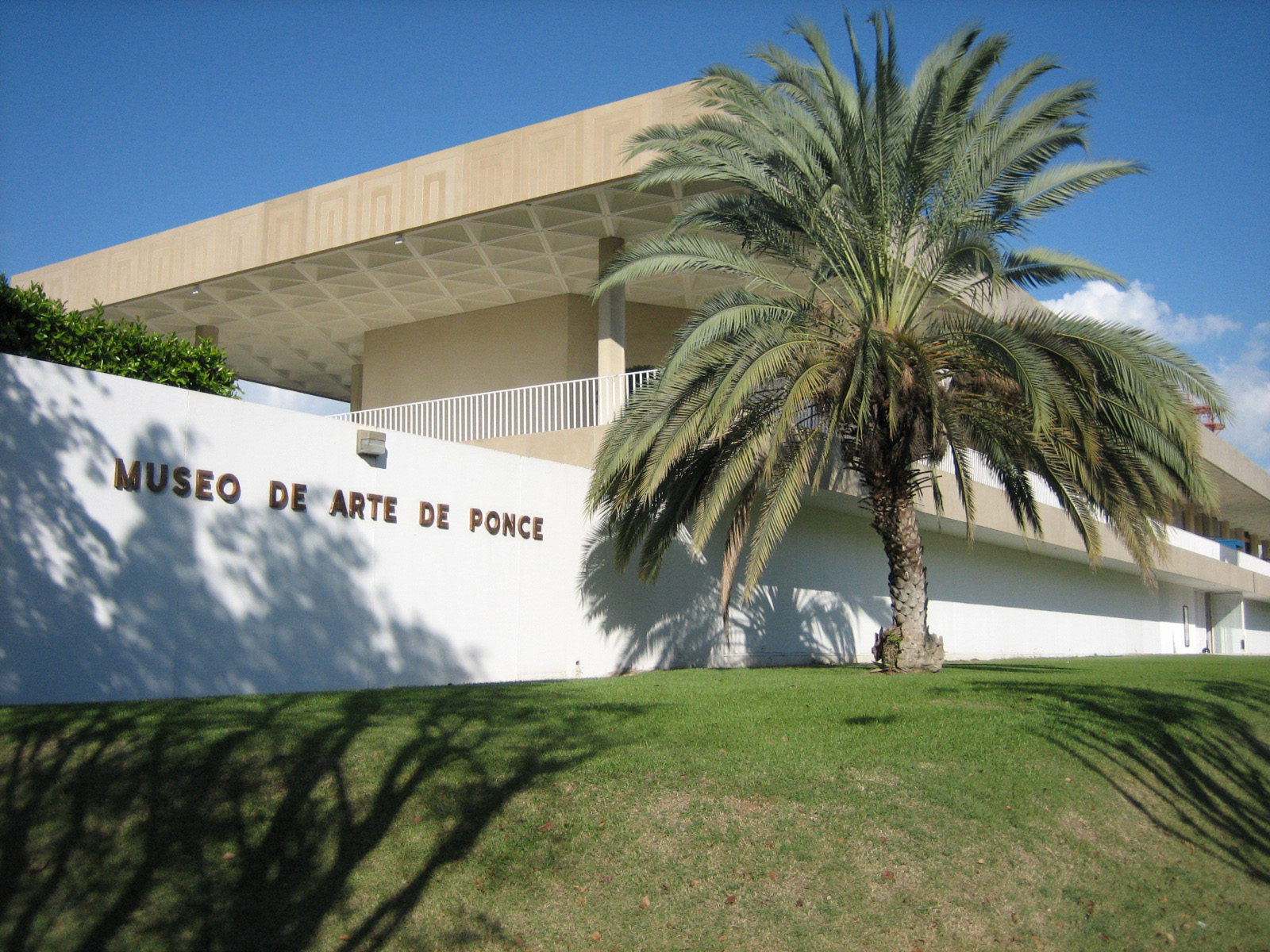
Ponce Museum of Art

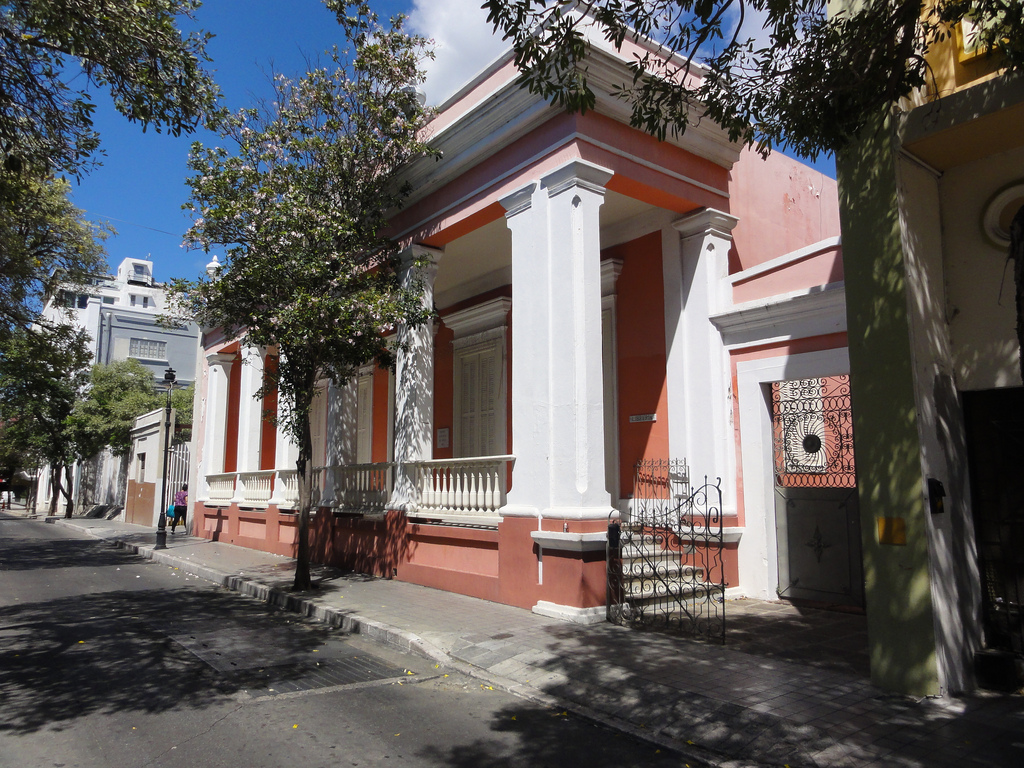
Centro Cultural de Ponce

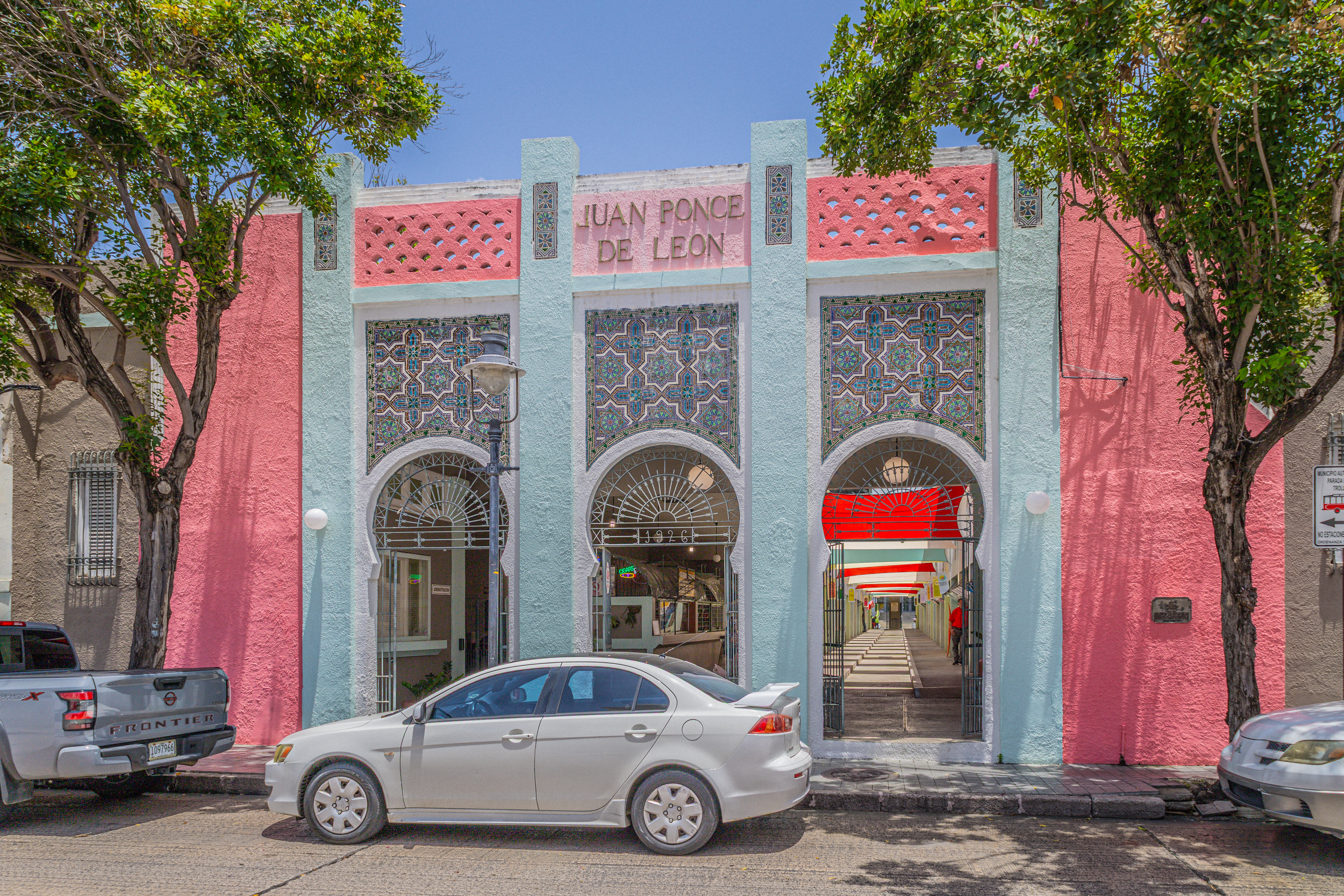
Plaza Juan Ponce de León

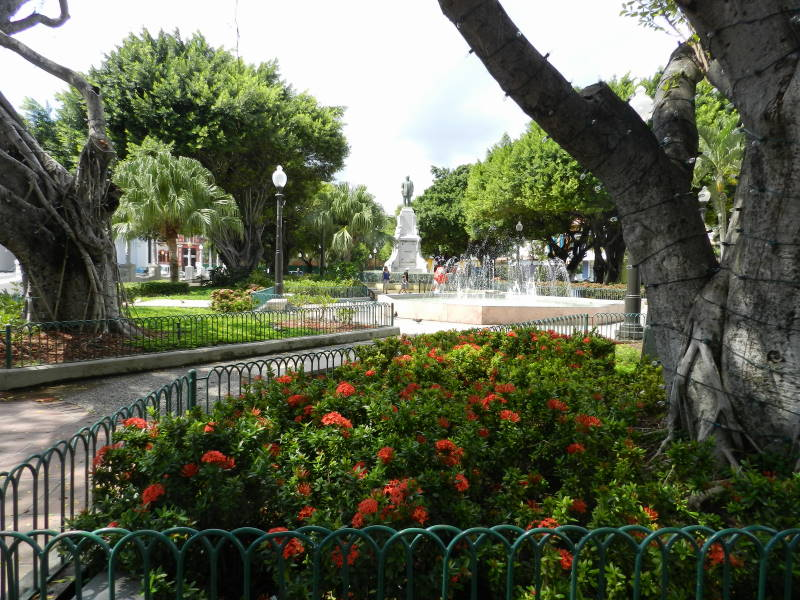
Plaza Las Delicias

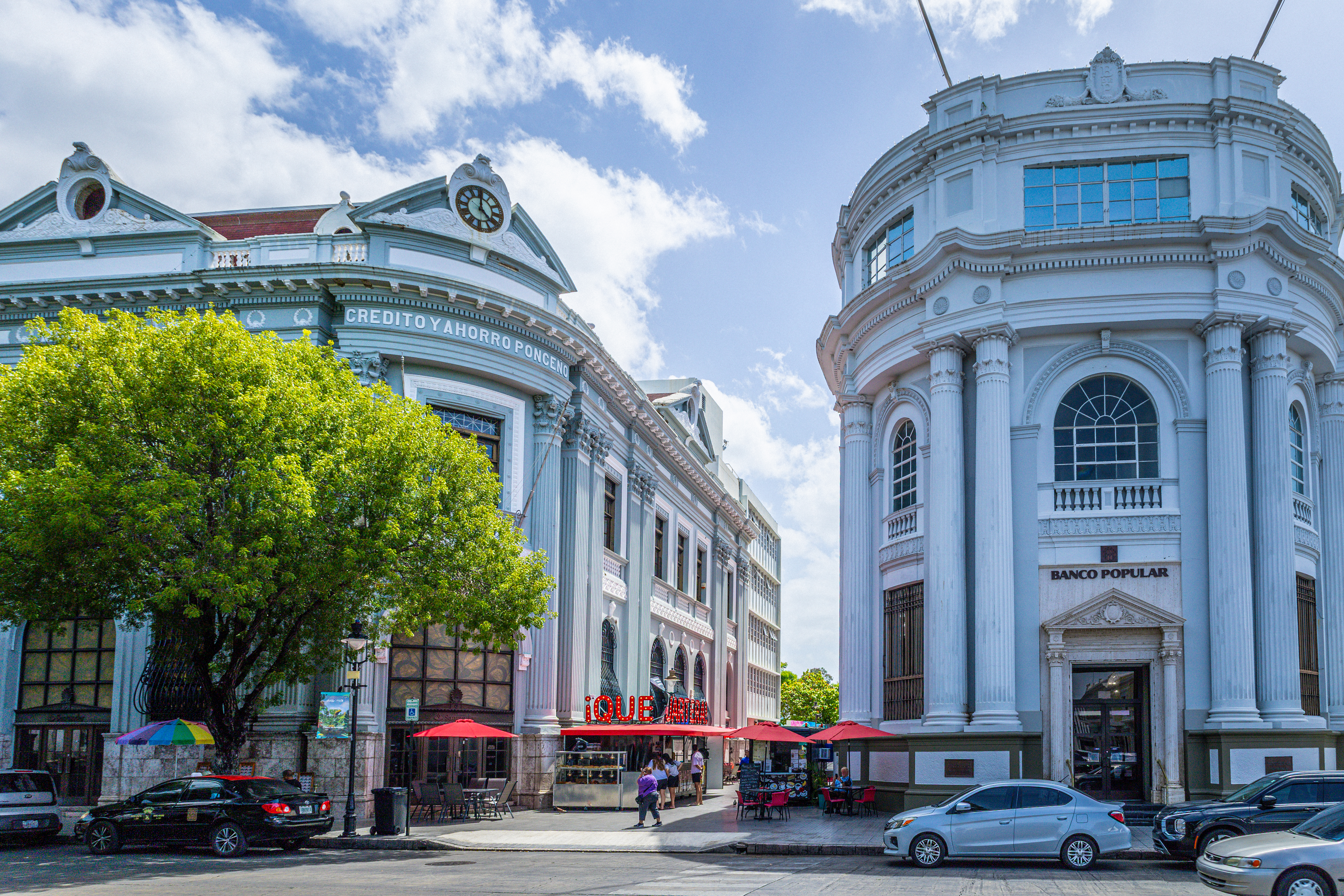
Historic banks of Ponce

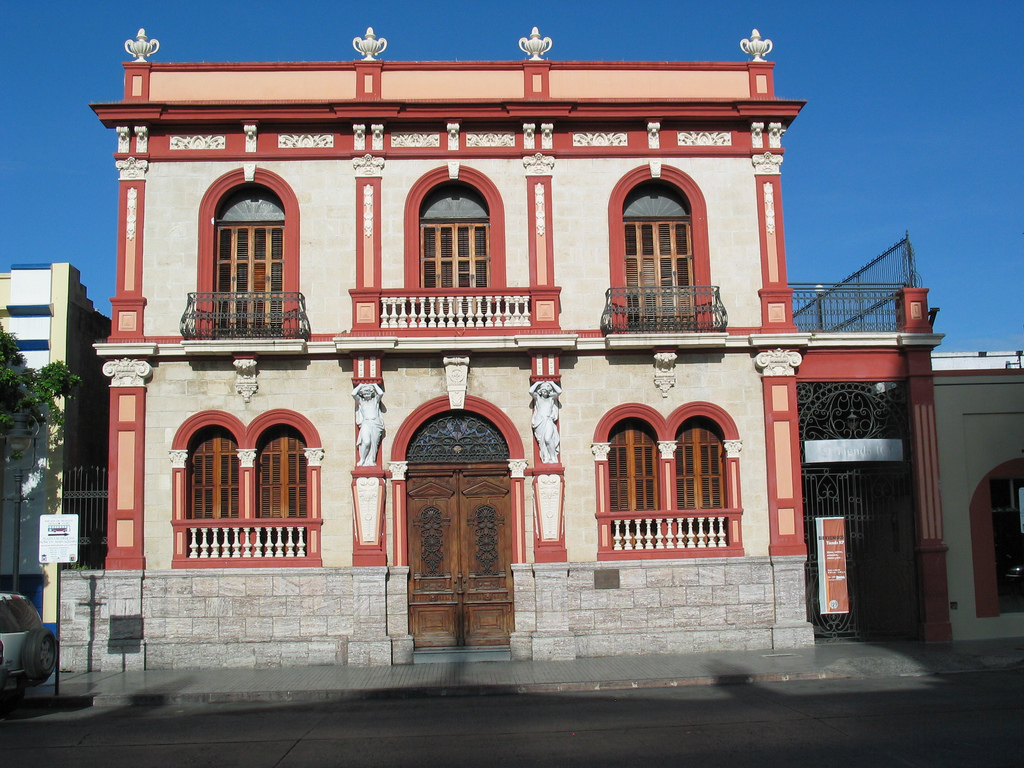
Armstrong-Poventud House

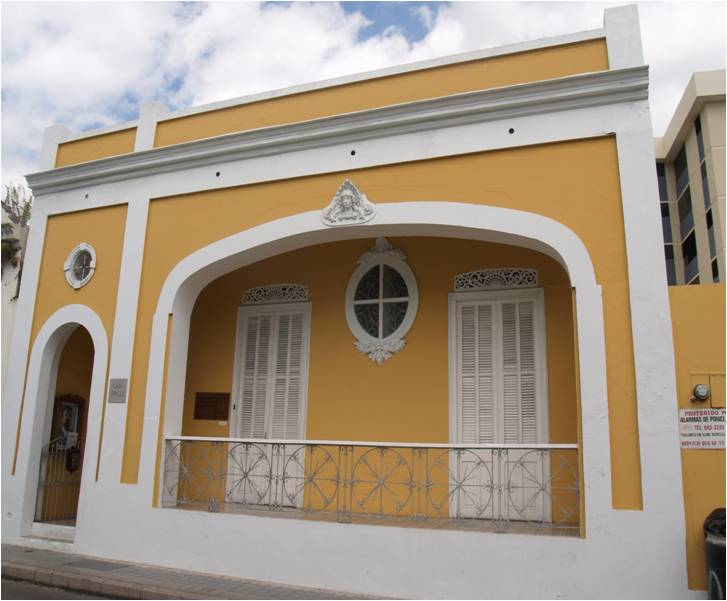
Casa Paoli, the childhood home of opera star Antonio Paoli

=== Plazas and markets ===
- Abolition Park, small plaza dedicated as a monument to the abolition of slavery in Puerto Rico that today hosts a small garden, an amphitheater, in addition to the monument itself.
- Dora Colón Clavell Square, Modernist plaza surrounded by various historic and architectural landmarks.
- Paseo Atocha, historic commercialized pedestrian street that connects Ponce's main town square with its main market square.
- Plaza del Mercado Isabel Segunda, the main market hall and market place of the city of Ponce. Famous for its Art Deco architecture, although no longer the main commercial building in the city it still functions as a marketplace and mall.
- Plaza Juan Ponce de León, Art Deco former meat market today functions as a pedestrian mall.
- Plaza Las Delicias, separated by the cathedral into Muñoz Rivera and Degetau Squares, is the main town square of the city of Ponce. Notable for its Victorian lampposts, fountains and landscaping, along with the Muñoz Rivera Park in San Juan, it is considered a trendsetter in the urban revitalization and redevelopment of public town squares in Puerto Rico during the 20th-century.
- Tricentenario Park, built to conmemorate the 300th anniversary of the founding of Ponce, consisting of three plazas dedicated to some of Ponce's most famous citizens.

=== Churches and religious buildings ===
- First United Methodist Church of Ponce, architecturally significant church which integrates Prairie School, Bungalow and Spanish Revival styles.
- Holy Trinity Church, established in 1869, is one of the oldest Anglican congregations to be founded in Hispanic America and the very first Protestant church to be built in Puerto Rico.
- Ponce Cathedral (Catedral de Nuestra Señora de Guadalupe), the centerpiece of Plaza Las Delicias is the main Roman Catholic church of Ponce and a major shrine to Our Lady of Guadalupe since the mid-18th century, it hosts a yearly devotional feast to her, locally known as Las Mañanitas.
- Ponce Islamic Center (Centro Islámico de Ponce), the oldest purpose-built mosque in Puerto Rico, with its design having the distinction of being architecturally inspired by the vernacular Ponce Creole style.

=== Museums ===
- Armstrong–Toro House, an ICP owned and managed house museum located at an architecturally significant residence designed by Manuel V. Domenech, considered one of the exemplary models of the Ponce Creole style.
- Carmen Solá de Pereira Ponce Cultural Center, cultural center and museum dedicated to the preservation of the culture and folklore of Ponce, located in the Ermelindo Salazar House.
- Francisco "Pancho" Coimbre Museum, dedicated to the history and documentation of sports in Puerto Rico, with a special focus on the life of baseball player Pancho Coimbre.
- Museum of Ponce Architecture, located in the Wiechers–Villaronga House, an ICP owned and manage architecture museum which interprets and showcases the wide range of architectural styles developed in the city of Ponce, in addition to the application of late 19th-century and early 20th-century local application of international architectural styles.
- Museum of Puerto Rican Autonomism, located in the grounds of the Old Cemetery of Ponce, it contains the Román Baldorioty de Castro National Pantheon, the burial place of many of Puerto Rico's most prominent historic figures.
- Museum of Puerto Rican Music, located in the historic Serrallés House, dedicated to the development and documentation of Puerto Rican music throughout its history.
- Paoli House, birthplace and house museum dedicated to the life and work of Antonio Paoli, the celebrated late 19th century and early 20th century Puerto Rican tenor.
- Parque de Bombas Museum, a former Victorian-style 1882 Exhibition Trade Fair pavilion today is one of the most iconic firehouses in Puerto Rico and a landmark of the city, hosting a firefighting museum that documents the history of the profession and of the building itself in the context of Ponce.
- Ponce History Museum, located in the Salazar–Candal House, dedicated to the social, cultural, political and natural history of Ponce.
- Ponce Massacre Museum, the ICP owned and managed museum documents and interprets the 1937 Ponce massacre.
- Ponce Museum of Art, the largest art museum in Puerto Rico and the Caribbean, it contains one of the largest Pre-Raphaelite collections in the Western Hemisphere.
- Rosita Serrallés House, a historic house and former music school that today functions as an annex to the Ponce History Museum, with a memorial dedicated to the Mameyes landslide, one of Puerto Rico's deadliest natural disasters.

=== Other places of interest ===
- Banco Crédito y Ahorro Ponceño and Banco de Ponce buildings, well-preserved pair of Neoclassical headquarters of the Ponce-based banks of the same name, today Santander and Banco Popular branch locations, respectively.
- Casino de Ponce, Second Empire style former casino, today it hosts private events such as weddings.
- Centro Español de Ponce, a now ruined Neoclassical building which used to host the Ponce Spanish Club and other social gatherings.
- El Castillo, the former Spanish Army barracks which played an important role in the Puerto Rico campaign of the Spanish-American War, today an art school.
- Fernando Luis Toro House, architecturally significant residence that demonstrates the influences of the Catalan Modernisme, American Craftsman and Ponce Creole styles.
- Font–Ubides House, historic Art Nouveau-inspired Ponce Creole-style residence.
- Hotel Meliá, historic Modernist hotel. One of the tenants in the building is the famous King's Cream, popularly known as Los Chinos de Ponce.
- Miguel C. Godreau House, although not open to the public is an important example of the Ponce Creole architecture.
- Oppenheimer House, historic residence noted for its Barcelona School-inspired Ponce Creole style.
- Parque de la Ceiba, small park and former residence of a famous Ceiba pentandra tree associated with the founding of the city.
- Ponce Aqueduct, formally Acueducto Alfonso XII, a preserved 2.5-mile 19th century aqueduct, the first of its kind to be built in Puerto Rico.
- The Ponce City Hall, the seat of the executive branch of the municipal government is the oldest existing building in the city.
- Ponce High School, the architecturally significant Neoclassical campus is the oldest continuously operating high school in Puerto Rico.
- Rosaly–Batiz House, historic residence of the Rosaly family, notable for its Palladian palazzo-inspired architecture.
- Saurí House, historic colonial townhouse, today the Ponce Plaza Hotel & Casino.
- Spanish Military Hospital ruins, along with the Ballajá Barracks in San Juan, the last major Spanish construction project to be built in the Americas.
- Subirá House, notable Ponce Creole-style house.
- Teatro Fox Delicias, a former Fox Theatre, today a boutique hotel.
- Teatro La Perla, the second oldest theater of its kind in the island is also one of the largest Neoclassical theaters in Puerto Rico and the Caribbean.
- Tricoche Hospital ruins, former Ponce Civic Hospital, with its impressive Neoclásico Isabelino architectural style despite its dilapidated state.
- Vives House, historic former residence of the prominent Vives family, owners of numerous sugarcane and coffee plantations (such as Hacienda Buena Vista).
- Zaldo de Nebot Residence, historic house notable for its French-inspired decorative designs.

== See also ==
- National Register of Historic Places in Ponce, Puerto Rico

External audio
- You may see some of the streets in Zona Historica de Ponce HERE
