= WPAB =

Radio station in Ponce, Puerto Rico

Ponce, Puerto Rico; Puerto Rico
- Broadcast area: Puerto Rico
- Frequency: 550 kHz
- Branding: PAB 550 Ponce; ECO 93 (FM translator)

Programming
- Format: Spanish News/Talk
- Affiliations: CNN Radio

Ownership
- Owner: WPAB, Inc.; (Alfonso Gimenez Porrata)

History
- First air date: August 22, 1940; 85 years ago
- Call sign meaning: Puerto Rico American Broadcasting

Technical information
- Licensing authority: FCC
- Facility ID: 53077
- Class: B
- Power: 5,000 watts
- Transmitter coordinates: 17°59′27″N 66°37′46″W
- Translator: 93.1 W226CS (Bayamon)

Links
- Public license information: Public file; LMS
- Webcast: Listen Live
- Website: pab550.com

WPAB (550 AM, "550 Ponce") is a radio station broadcasting a Spanish News/Talk format. Licensed to Ponce, Puerto Rico, it serves the greater Puerto Rico area. The station is currently owned by WPAB, Inc. Its call letters, PAB, stand for "Puerto Rican American Broadcasting" corporation.

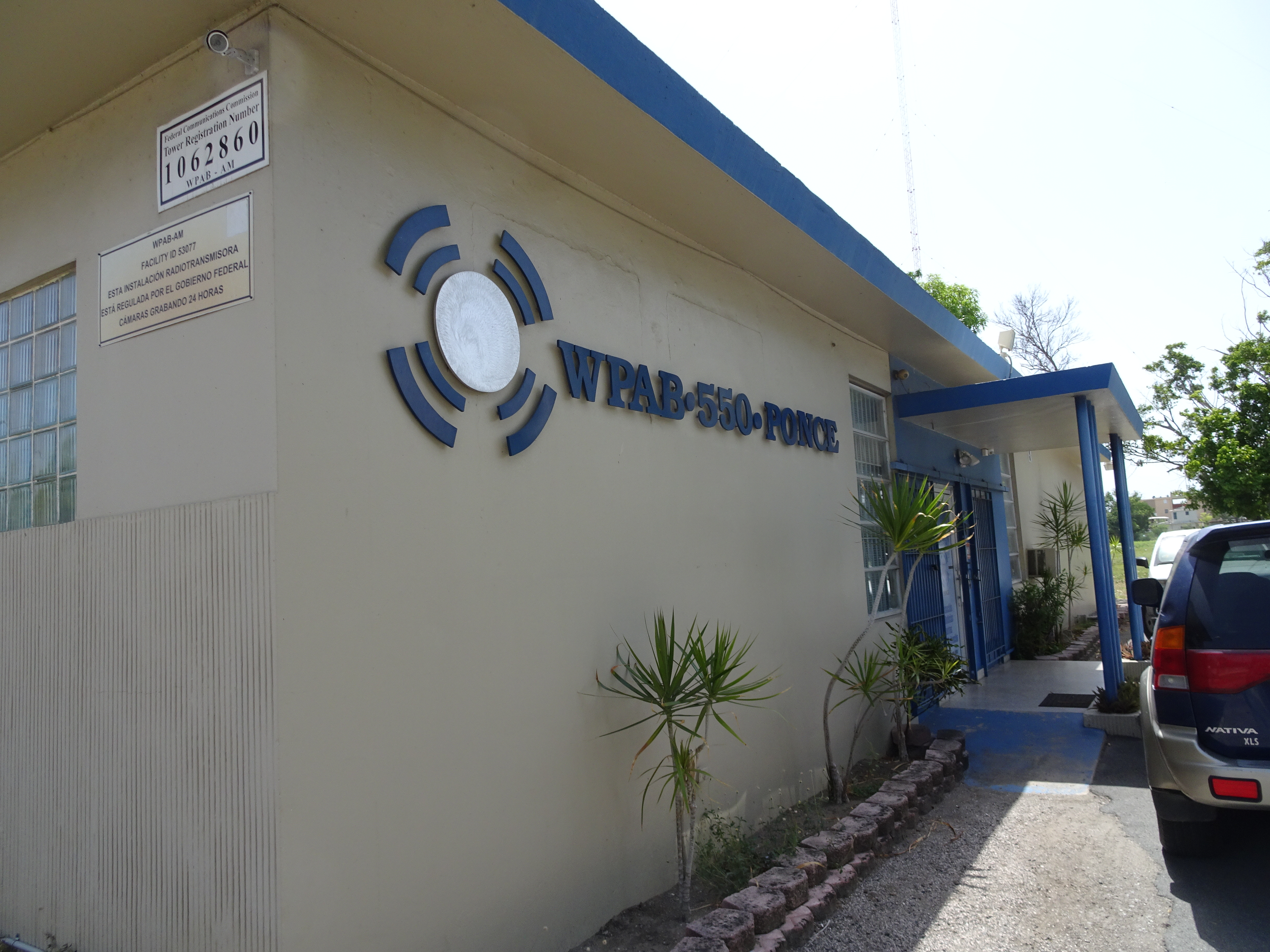
Radio station WPAB, on PR-678, Barrio Playa, Ponce, Puerto Rico

The station is shared with translator station W226CS 93.1 FM in Bayamon, covering the entire metropolitan area.

== Significance ==
The radio station is "one of the most important radio stations in Puerto Rico", and the one that introduced Puerto Rico to the news and interviews format.

== History ==
The station was founded in August 1940 by Miguel Soltero Palermo and Alfonso Giménez Aguayo. It had its first studios on Calle Leon in the Ponce Historic Zone, then moved to more spacious quarters on Calle Villa in the 1950s. It is located at 1831 Ave. Eduardo Ruberté, in Barrio Playa, Ponce, Puerto Rico. During the 1970s, WPAB served as the Leones de Ponce official station with Ramón Morales as its narrator.

== Translator stations ==
Broadcast translator for WPAB
Call sign	Frequency	City of license	FID	ERP (W)	FCC info
W226CS	93.1 FM	Bayamon, Puerto Rico	202653	.247	LMS
