= Museo de la Música Puertorriqueña =

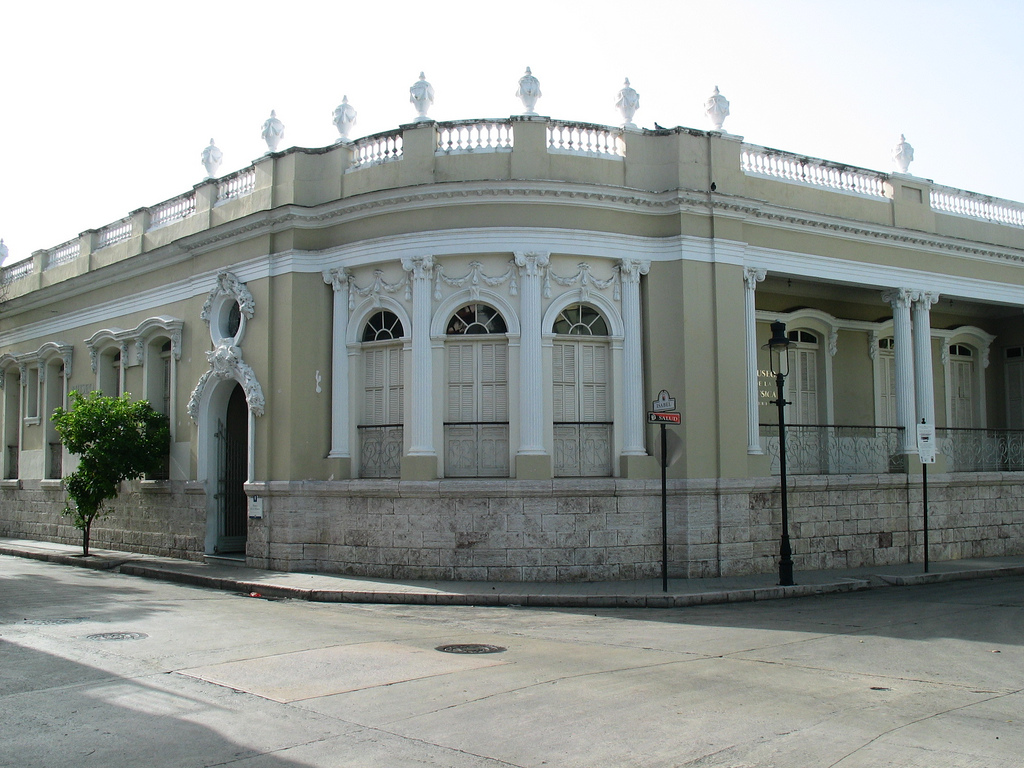
- Museo de la Música Puertorriqueña in Barrio Cuarto

- Location within Puerto Rico
- Established: 1990
- Location: SE corner of Calle Isabel and Calle Salud, Ponce, Puerto Rico
- Coordinates: 18°0′45.3234″N 66°36′38.772″W
- Type: Music history museum
- Owner: State (ICP)

The Museo de la Música Puertorriqueña (English: Museum of Puerto Rican Music) is a museum in Ponce, Puerto Rico, that showcases the development of Puerto Rican music, with displays of Taíno, Spanish, and African musical instruments that were played in the romantic danza genre, the favorite music of 19th-century Puerto Rican high society, as well as the more African-inspired bomba and plena styles. Also on display are memorabilia of composers and performers. The Museum traces the rich musical history of Puerto Rico through memorabilia of prominent musicians and displays of the musical instruments associated with the three genres of music that originated in this Caribbean island.

The building that houses the museum is known as Casa Serrallés and it was the former downtown residence (as opposed to his hilltop Castillo Serrallés structure) of Juan Eugenio Serrallés and his family, owners of Destilería Serrallés and makers of the Don Q rum.

== History ==
In 1986, the Ponce Municipal Government purchased the Castillo Serrallés to turn it into the Museum of Puerto Rican Music. However, the idea of turning Castillo Serrallés into a music museum was subsequently discarded.

In 1991 the first headquarters of the Museo de la Musica Puertorriqueña were located at 70 Cristina Street in what is now the Centro Cultural de Ponce. The pastel villa building was built by a well known architect named Juan Bertoli Calderoni, who also built many other buildings throughout Puerto Rico. It was designed in the neo-classic architectural style, specifically a French style architecture.

In 1996, the Instituto de Cultura Puertorriqueña (ICP) moved the Music Museum to its current location at Isabel and Salud streets. The current structure, acquired by the ICP, was built as the residence of the Serrallés-Nevárez family. Félix Juan Serrallés, who married Francisca Nevárez, was a prominent local industrialist, and himself the grandson of prominent businessman Juan Serrallés, the founder of the Destilería Serrallés rum company. This house on Calle Isabel was the Serallés family's everyday downtown Ponce residence, as compared to their hilltop Serralles Castle residence. The back yard of the property still preserves an outdoors bar-like area complete with the Destileria Serrallés and Don Quixote logo.

Museo de la Música Puertorriqueña is not to be confused with Museo de la Música, in Guaynabo, Puerto Rico, also known as Museo de la Música Rafael Ithier, an $18 million museum project by the Guaynabo municipal government which failed to open and was abandoned in March 2020.

== Museum ==
The building was restored in 1990 by the Institute of Puerto Rican Culture with the goal of paying tribute to the works of Puerto Rican musicians in the most honorable way possible. The building is easily spotted as it is housed in a pastel-colored villa, intentionally meant to attract visitors. The museum exhibitions are presented in both Spanish and English. The museum building is located at the southeast corner of Isabel and Salud streets.

The museum is "designed to produce the necessary visual and auditory impact on the audience so as to maximize the potential to draw the actual value of the unique Puerto Rican music". The distinctive Puerto Rican music is often exported to other islands in the Caribbean. It is also widely played throughout other parts of the world, especially in the United States. The displays show how Puerto Rican music started and how it has developed over the years. Some of the instruments displayed are the güicharo or güiro, which is a gourd that has been hollowed out, and variants of the original six-string Spanish guitar-like instruments the requinto and bordonua.

On 15 September 2004, the Legislative Assembly of Puerto Rico approved Law 307 where by the ICP continued to maintain ownership of the Museo de la Musica property (as well as ownership of Casa de la Masacre de Ponce, Casa Wiechers-Villaronga and Casa Armstrong-Poventud), but the municipal government was to become responsible for the security, preservation and maintenance of the structure.

== Honors ==
In June 2012, the Senate of Puerto Rico approved Resolución Conjunta del Senado 957 (Joint Senate Resolution 957) to rename the Museo de Música Puertorriqueña as Museo de la Música Puertorriqueña Ruth Fernández in honor of the singer.

== See also ==
- List of music museums
- Casa Serrallés
- Castillo Serrallés
- Destilería Serrallés
- Don Q
