= National Register of Historic Places listings in southern Puerto Rico =

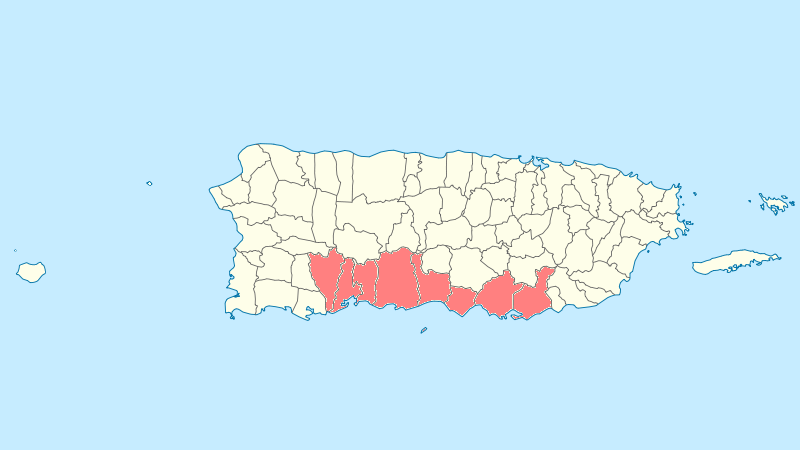
National Register entries listed below are found in the highlighted 8 municipalities of Puerto Rico.

This is a list of properties and districts in the southern municipalities of Puerto Rico that are listed on the National Register of Historic Places (Spanish: Registro Nacional de Lugares Históricos). It includes places along the southern coast of the island, and on the south slope of Puerto Rico's Cordillera Central.

The area covered spans from the city of Yauco on the southwest coast to the Guayama municipality at the southeast.

Names of places given are as they appear in the National Register, reflecting name as given in NRHP application at the date of listing. Note, the National Register name system does not accommodate Spanish á, ñ and other letters.

This National Park Service list is complete through NPS recent listings posted May 29, 2026.

== Guayama ==
	Name on the Register	Image	Date listed	Location	Barrio	Description
1	Carretera #4	Carretera #4	October 30, 2020 (#100005741)	PR-15, from km. 0 in Guayama to km. 25.7 in Cayey; 18°03′01″N 66°08′07″W	Guayama to Cayey	Former spur route of the Carretera Central which provided connection across the Sierra de Cayey. Today known as Puerto Rico Highway 15.
2	Casa Cautiño	Casa Cautiño	December 31, 1984 (#84003137)	1 N. Santiago Palmer Street; 17°59′09″N 66°06′48″W	Guayama Pueblo	Built in 1887, this house is one of the best remaining examples of southern Puerto Rico's 19th-century vernacular style of urban domestic architecture, blended with extensive Neoclassical elements. Especially notable is the house's masonry, wood, and metal ornamentation. It was acquired for use as a museum in 1979.
3	Cayey Bridge	Cayey Bridge	July 19, 1995 (#95000845)	Highway 15, km 1, spanning Río Guamaní; 17°59′59″N 66°06′46″W	Caimital and Palmas	This 1891 iron bridge carries the nineteenth century highway between Guayama and Cayey, which was once the only link between the coastal east of Puerto Rico and the rest of the island. Its lateral lattice girder design is characteristic of Puerto Rico but rare in the United States.
4	Eleuterio Derkes Grammar School	Eleuterio Derkes Grammar School	August 4, 1987 (#87001312)	José María Anguelí Street; 17°58′55″N 66°06′42″W	Guayama Pueblo	Built in 1908, this school was designed during a period when schools were gaining importance as civic institutions in Puerto Rico. Its simplified Neoclassical design emphasized this shift, and it became a prototype for a generation of school construction on the island.
5	Iglesia Parroquial de San Antonio de Padua de Guayama	Iglesia Parroquial de San Antonio de Padua de Guayama	July 30, 1976 (#76002248)	5 Ashford Street; 17°59′07″N 66°06′46″W	Guayama Pueblo	This church was first built in the 18th century and rebuilt twice in the 19th century and its present appearance dates from 1874. It takes an overall Romanesque form, while the details exhibit the eclecticism that characterized much Puerto Rican architecture in the later 1800s.
6	Ingenio Azucarero Vives	Ingenio Azucarero Vives	September 1, 1976 (#76002249)	Avenida Central; 17°58′38″N 66°06′59″W	Guayama Pueblo	The Vives Sugar Mill, built c. 1828, comprises the remains of a windmill and processing building. Constructed of river rock, cut granite, and some brick, it contrasts with later industrial buildings built primarily of brick. The mill recalls an era when the sugar industry used slave labor almost exclusively, and witnessed a slave uprising in the first half of the 19th century.

== Guayanilla ==
	Name on the Register	Image	Date listed	Location	Barrio	Description
1	Hacienda La Fortuna		March 31, 2025 (#100011591)	Barrio Sierra Baja, PR-375 Km. 1.5; 18°04′49″N 66°48′32″W	Guayanilla	Former sugarcane farm, when it ceased operating in 1937 it was the last of its kind in Puerto Rico during the advent of the sugarcane mills (centrales azucareras). It also produced coffee.
2	Padre Nazario School	Padre Nazario School	November 14, 2012 (#12000936)	4 Concepción Street; 18°01′08″N 66°47′25″W	Guayanilla Pueblo	Completed in 1926, this primary school epitomizes the monumental schools built in Puerto Rico during the early 20th century. Its Neoclassical and Spanish Revival details at the entry and spatial sequence of the vestibule are exceptional design features.

== Juana Díaz ==
	Name on the Register	Image	Date listed	Location	Barrio	Description
1	Carretera Central	Carretera Central	May 2, 2019 (#100003686)	Highway 14 from Coamo boundary to Ponce boundary (Note: The listed portion of the Carretera Central extends into Caguas, Cidra, Cayey, Aibonito, Coamo, and Juana Díaz. The roadway route in San Juan and Ponce, as well as a portion in Caguas, was excluded from the National Register listing.); 18°03′04″N 66°28′45″W	Río Cañas Arriba, Río Cañas Abajo, Tijeras, Juana Díaz Pueblo, Jacaguas, and Callabo	Built by the Spanish administration during 1846–1886 to connect San Juan with Ponce, this was one of the first modern roadways in Puerto Rico and was regarded as one of the finest roads in the Americas for years after its completion. The listed portion of the road, from Caguas to Juana Díaz, includes the exceptionally challenging engineering through the Cordillera Central, 11 major bridges, 14 maintenance workers' houses, (Note: Spanish: casillas de caminero.) and numerous other roadway structures.
2	Church San Juan Bautista y San Ramón Nonato of Juana Diaz (Note: The name of Church San Juan Bautista y San Ramón Nonato of Juana Diaz is presented here without the accent on "Díaz" in conformance with the usage in the house's National Register nomination form and announcement of listing. The latter source additionally omits the accent from "Ramón", which was retained here.)	Church San Juan Bautista y San Ramón Nonato of Juana Diaz	December 10, 1984 (#84000465)	Town Plaza; 18°03′10″N 66°30′19″W	Juana Díaz Pueblo	This Baroque church built in 1807 (Note: Construction of the Church San Juan Bautista y San Ramón Nonato of Juana Diaz began in 1807. A completion date is not stated in the available sources. Major elements (the north tower) were added possibly as late as 1895.) retains most of its original design, construction, and materials, including masonry walls, towers, sacristies, interior arcades, dome, and wooden spiral stairway in the south tower. The church's placement in the town plaza and close to the town hall reflect the Crown-mandated urban design principles of the early 19th century.
3	Cueva Lucero	Cueva Lucero	September 26, 2008 (#08000936)	Address restricted (Note: Federal and state laws and practices restrict general public access to information regarding the specific location of this resource. In some cases, this is to protect archaeological sites from vandalism, while in other cases it is restricted at the request of the owner.)	Guayabal	This cave includes more than 100 pre-Hispanic petroglyphs and pictographs dating possibly as early as the 7th century C.E., "making it one of the best examples of aboriginal rock art in the Antilles." Most of the images are zoomorphic in nature. It has been known to archaeologists since at least the early 1900s.
4	Porto Rico Irrigation Service		January 26, 2026 (#100012627)	the system which irrigates the lands situated between the Patillas and the Salinas Rivers	Juana Díaz	

== Peñuelas ==
	Name on the Register	Image	Date listed	Location	Barrio	Description
1	Daniel Webster School	Daniel Webster School	November 14, 2012 (#12000940)	255 Luis Muñoz Rivera Street; 18°03′16″N 66°43′20″W	Peñuelas Pueblo	Designer Francisco Gardón Vega (Note: Rafael Carmoega, at the time Chief Architect in the Division of Public Works of the Puerto Rico Department of the Interior, was the architect of record while Gardón Vega, a drafter in the division, was responsible for the school's design.) employed a mixture of Beaux-Arts and Spanish Revival styles in this 1927 school, a common stylistic approach in Puerto Rico at the time. The school quickly became a centerpiece of public architecture in Peñuelas, surpassing the church and city hall, and remains important to local public identity.

== Ponce ==
	Name on the Register	Image	Date listed	Location	Barrio	Description
1	Acueducto Alfonso XII	Acueducto Alfonso XII	December 30, 2019 (#100004854)	Calle del Acueducto; 18°01′17″N 66°36′51″W	Portugués Urbano and Sexto	This aqueduct, completed in 1878 and in service until 1928, was the key component of Ponce's first system for distribution of potable water. It exemplifies 19th century design principles, and recalls civic investments to promote the welfare of urban inhabitants. Of the aqueduct's total length of 4 kilometers (2.5 mi), about 400 meters (1,300 ft) are included in the historic listing.
2	Albergue Caritativo Tricoche	Albergue Caritativo Tricoche	May 14, 1987 (#87000769)	Tricoche Street; 18°01′00″N 66°36′55″W	Segundo	Spanish Royal Corps of Engineers-built hospital from 1878 designed in the Neoclásico Isabelino style. Part of the 19th Century Civil Architecture in Ponce NRHP thematic nomination.
3	Antiguo Cuartel Militar Español de Ponce	Antiguo Cuartel Militar Español de Ponce	May 14, 1987 (#87000772)	End of Castillo Street; 18°00′55″N 66°36′30″W	Quinto	Spanish military headquarters in Ponce built in 1894 in the local Neoclásico Isabelino style. Its garrisoned troops participated in the 1898 Puerto Rico campaign and throughout its history it also served as a courthouse, jailhouse and today it hosts the Ponce School of Fine Arts.
4	Antiguo Hospital Militar Español de Ponce	Antiguo Hospital Militar Español de Ponce	May 14, 1987 (#87000770)	León, Atocha, and Bondad Streets; 18°01′08″N 66°36′52″W	Sexto	Spanish Royal Corps of Engineers-built military hospital from 1897 designed in the local Neoclásico Isabelino style, it was the last major Spanish building to be constructed in the Americas. Part of the 19th Century Civil Architecture in Ponce NRHP thematic nomination.
5	Armstrong-Toro House	Armstrong-Toro House	October 29, 1987 (#87001821)	9 Unión Street; 18°00′42″N 66°36′53″W	Segundo	Neoclassical designed by Manuel Domenech and built in 1899. It played an important role in the development of the Ponce Creole architectural style inspired by the Belle Époque. Today preserved as a museum by the Institute of Puerto Rican Culture.
6	Banco Crédito y Ahorro Ponceño	Banco Crédito y Ahorro Ponceño	June 25, 1987 (#87001002)	Junction of Marina and Amor Streets; 18°00′41″N 66°36′48″W	Tercero	Beaux Arts-style bank building designed by Francisco Porrata Doria and built in 1924.
7	Banco de Ponce	Banco de Ponce	June 25, 1987 (#87001003)	Junction of Amor and Comercio Streets; 18°00′40″N 66°36′48″W	Tercero	Beaux Arts-style bank building designed by Francisco Porrata Doria and also built in 1924.
8	Carretera Num. 6	Carretera Num. 6	September 14, 2021 (#100006919)	Road #6	Ponce vicinity	Historic 19th-century farm-to-market road constructed to link major coffee-growing areas in nearby Adjuntas with Ponce and its port for the purpose of its trade and export.
9	Casa Alcaldía de Ponce – City Hall	Casa Alcaldía de Ponce – City Hall	November 19, 1986 (#86003197)	South side of Plaza Las Delicias; 18°00′39″N 66°36′50″W	Primero	The oldest colonial building still standing in the Ponce Historic Zone, the Neoclásico Isabelino-style City Hall from 1846 is a symbol of the city charter granted by Isabella II of Spain and has served as a civic center, jailhouse and reception venue for visiting US presidents and foreign dignitaries.
10	Casa de la Masacre	Casa de la Masacre	October 20, 2005 (#05001098)	31 Marina Street; 18°00′34″N 66°36′49″W	Cuarto	As the Ponce headquarters of the Puerto Rican Nationalist Party during the 1930s, this house bore witness to the massacre of March 21, 1937, in which 19 demonstrators and bystanders and 2 police officers were killed. It is architecturally significant as an outstanding example of vernacular creole design by Blas Silva from the first decade of the 20th century. It became a museum in 1988.
11	Casa Miguel C. Godreau (Note: Sources authoritative with regard to National Register listing parameters give different forms of the house's name, including Casa Miguel C. Godreau from the house's nomination form and official announcement of entry on the National Register, and Godreau, Miguel C., Casa from the comprehensive National Register database. This article adopts the first of these, Casa Miguel C. Godreau, because it offers the most proper Spanish usage.)	Casa Miguel C. Godreau	April 30, 1986 (#86000894)	146 Reina Street; 18°00′43″N 66°37′08″W	Segundo	House from 1919, designed in an eclectic style by Julio Conesa.
12	Casa Paoli	Casa Paoli	October 1, 2009 (#09000769)	14 Mayor Street; 18°00′36″N 66°36′46″W	Cuarto	This house was the birthplace and childhood home of great operatic tenor Antonio Paoli (1871–1946) until 1883. It was in Ponce's rich cultural environment that Paoli was first exposed to the arts, and this house is the only property remaining in Puerto Rico associated with the island's first performing artist of international renown.
13	Casa Ricardo Ruiz Mari		May 29, 2024 (#100010382)	Calle Arias #14; 17°58′52″N 66°37′20″W	Playa de Ponce	Historic well-preserved 1899 residence.
14	Casa Serrallés	Casa Serrallés	March 13, 2025 (#100011511)	45 Calle Reina Isabel, esq. Salud; 18°00′46″N 66°36′39″W		Alfredo Wiechers Pieretti-designed Neoclassical residence built for the prominent Serrallés family in 1911. Today home to the Museum of Puerto Rican Music.
15	Casa Vives	Casa Vives	February 13, 2013 (#13000013)	88 Paseo Atocha at Vives/Castillo Street; 18°00′51″N 66°36′49″W	Quinto	Neoclassical mansion block designed by Juan Bertoli Calderoni and built in 1860, making it one of the oldest brick and mortar residences in Ponce. It was the former residence of coffee plantation owner Carlos Vives.
16	Casino de Ponce	Casino de Ponce	October 28, 1987 (#87001818)	Junction of Marina and Luna Streets; 18°00′36″N 66°36′48″W	Cuarto	Second Empire- and Neo-Rococo-style building from 1922, designed by Agustin Camilo Gonzalez. In addition to its role as a casino it was also used as post office, a civic office and an event venue and reception hall by local businesspeople and visiting dignitaries.
17	Castillo de Serralles (Note: The name of the Castillo de Serralles is presented here without the accent on "Serrallés" in conformance with the usage in the house's National Register nomination form and Federal Register announcement of listing.)	Castillo de Serralles	November 3, 1980 (#80004494)	Cerro El Vigía; 18°01′07″N 66°37′09″W	Portugués Urbano	Spanish Mediterranean style "castle" from 1926 designed by Pedro Adolfo de Castro and built for sugarcane magnate Juan Serrallés Colón, founder of Hacienda Mercedita.
18	Cathedral Nuestra Señora de Guadalupe of Ponce	Cathedral Nuestra Señora de Guadalupe of Ponce	December 10, 1984 (#84000467)	Plaza Las Delicias; 18°00′43″N 66°36′50″W	Segundo	Neoclassical cathedral from 1835 designed by Francisco Porrata Doria to replace the former church building that was previously damaged by earthquakes and fires. It is also of cultural importance as it hosts the yearly Las Mañanitas in honor of the city patroness Our Lady of Guadalupe.
19	Cementerio Antiguo de Ponce	Cementerio Antiguo de Ponce	January 5, 1984 (#84003149)	1 Torre Street at Frontispicio Street; 18°00′57″N 66°37′04″W	Segundo	Neo-classical municipal cemetery from 1842. Its 1864 enlargement was designed by Nieto Blajol Iglesia and today it serves as a cemetery museum and as the Román Baldorioty de Castro National Pantheon.
20	Cementerio Catolico San Vicente de Paul (Note: The name of the Cementerio Catolico San Vicente de Paul is presented here without the accent on "Católico" in conformance with the usage in the cemetery's National Register nomination form and announcement of listing.)	Cementerio Catolico San Vicente de Paul	August 25, 1988 (#88001249)	Alma Sublime Street; 18°01′00″N 66°38′02″W	Magueyes Urbano	Historic Classical Revival, Spanish Revival, Art Deco cemetery from 1901, also known as the Catholic Cemetery of Ponce.
21	Centro Ceremonial Indígena	Centro Ceremonial Indígena	April 14, 1978 (#78003381)	Highway 503; 18°02′32″N 66°37′18″W	Tibes and Portugués	Archaeological site also known as the Tibes Site consisting of pre-Hispanic ceremonial ball courts or bateyes, in addition to pre-Taino burial sites dating to at least 700 AD. Part of the Ball court/plaza sites of Puerto Rico and the U.S. Virgin Islands multiple property submission. Today managed by the municipality as the Tibes Indigenous Ceremonial Center.
22	Edificio Empresas Ferré	Edificio Empresas Ferré	August 27, 2013 (#13000638)	834 Eugenio María de Hostos Avenue; 17°58′55″N 66°37′12″W	Playa	Mid 20th-century International Style office and workshop building and former headquarters of Ponce Cement and Puerto Rico Iron Works. The listing includes "La Fundición", a mural painted in its lobby by famed muralist Rafael Ríos Rey in 1953.
23	Edificio Municipal de la Playa de Ponce	Edificio Municipal de la Playa de Ponce	August 27, 2013 (#13000639)	28 Alfonso XII Street at Padre Noel Avenue; 17°58′55″N 66°37′16″W	Playa	Designed by Manuel V. Domenech in a Reinaissance-inspired Spanish Revival style, it served as the former municipal civic center of the Ponce Playa district, a settlement that grew in and around the Port of Ponce in the 19th century.
24	Faro de la Isla de Caja de Muertos	Faro de la Isla de Caja de Muertos	October 22, 1981 (#81000690)	Isla Caja de Muertos; 17°53′35″N 66°31′16″W	Playa	Spanish-built Neo-classical lighthouse from 1887 located in the island of Caja de Muertos.
25	Faro del Puerto de Ponce	Faro del Puerto de Ponce	October 22, 1981 (#81000691)	Isla Cardona, Ponce Harbor; 17°57′24″N 66°38′06″W	Playa	Spanish-built Neo-classical lighthouse from 1889 located in Cardona Island at the entrance to the Port of Ponce.
26	Font–Ubides House	Font–Ubides House	October 29, 1987 (#87001825)	34 Castillo Street; 18°00′54″N 66°36′39″W	Quinto	Historic Ponce Creole-style residence building designed by Blas C. Silva and built in 1913.
27	Hacienda Buena Vista	Hacienda Buena Vista	October 17, 1994 (#91001499)	Highway123, km 16.8, near Corral Viejo; 18°05′03″N 66°39′17″W	Magueyes	Historic and well-preserved coffee plantation from 1833. Its main plantation house was built in a traditional Spanish Colonial-style while its surrounding buildings and warehouses consist of a Vernacular style. It contains the last remaining example of a Barker hydraulic turbine in the world.
28	Iglesia de la Santísima Trinidad	Iglesia de la Santísima Trinidad	September 29, 1986 (#86002766)	Marina, Salud, and Abolición Streets; 18°00′25″N 66°36′46″W	Cuarto	Late Gothic Revival and Mission/Spanish Revival-style church from 1926. The congregation is the first Anglican and oldest Protestant church in Puerto Rico and the only one existing prior to the American invasion in 1898.
29	La Perla Auditorium and Public Library	La Perla Auditorium and Public Library	September 27, 2021 (#100007054)	Calle Mayor Esq. Cristina; 18°00′44″N 66°36′43″W	Tercero	The second oldest theater building in Puerto Rico, designed by Juan Bertoli Calderoni and built under the initiative of Francisco Parra Duperón between 1860 and 1864.
30	McCabe Memorial Church	McCabe Memorial Church	April 11, 2008 (#08000283)	835 Eugenio María de Hostos Avenue; 17°58′56″N 66°37′14″W	Playa	Neo-gothic church designed by Antonin Nechodoma and built in 1908 as part of a missional outreach of the American Methodist Church. It is one of the oldest Protestant congregations in Puerto Rico.
31	Mercado de las Carnes	Mercado de las Carnes	November 17, 1986 (#86003199)	Alley connecting Mayor and León Streets, between Estrella and Guadalupe Streets; 18°00′56″N 66°36′46″W	Quinto	Early Art Deco meat market from 1926 designed by Rafael Carmoega. Built as a pedestrian mall across from the historic Ponce Marketplace it incorporates Revivalist elements inspired by Spanish Baroque and Mudéjar styles.
32	Missionary Society of the Methodist Episcopal Church	Missionary Society of the Methodist Episcopal Church	October 29, 1987 (#87001822)	135 Villa Street; 18°00′37″N 66°36′58″W	Primero	Bungalow, integrating Neo-Gothic, Spanish Revival, Spanish Baroque, and byzantine elements, from 1907, designed by Antonin Nechodoma.
33	Oppenheimer House	Oppenheimer House	October 29, 1987 (#87001824)	47 Salud Street; 18°00′34″N 66°36′43″W	Cuarto	Ponce Creole-style house with elements from the Barcelona School from 1913, designed by Alfredo B. Weichers for Isabel Oppenheimer de Santiago.
34	Parque de Bombas de Ponce	Parque de Bombas de Ponce	July 12, 1984 (#84003150)	Plaza Las Delicias; 18°00′43″N 66°36′49″W	Segundo	Historic firehouse built in a Gothic style in 1882 by Maximo de Meana y Guridi originally as an exhibit pavilion for the 1882 Exhibition Trade Fair in Ponce. Today it serves as the Museo Parque de Bombas.
35	Ponce High School	Ponce High School	August 4, 1987 (#87001310)	Cristina Street; 18°00′42″N 66°36′37″W	Tercero	Classical Revival school building complex from 1915, designed by Adrian C. Finlayson. At the time it was the largest school in the island and today it stands as a landmark of the history of education in Puerto Rico.
36	Ponce Public School 1913		August 23, 2022 (#100008052)	Calle Concordia; 18°00′27″N 66°36′53″W	Primero	This 1913 school was designed by insular architect Albert B. McCulloch using the Mission Revival and Classical Revival styles. It is architecturally significant as a well-preserved example of the Puerto Rican school buildings of the early 20th century, a period of great transformation in Puerto Rico under the American administration.
37	Ponce YMCA Building	Ponce YMCA Building	June 4, 2012 (#12000331)	7843 Nazaret Street, Urbanización Santa María; 18°00′21″N 66°37′02″W	Canas Urbano	Historic YMCA famous for its mural "El Hombre" by famed artist Rafael Ríos Rey. Part of the Rafael Rios Rey Multiple Property Submission.
38	Puente Río Inabón	Puente Río Inabón	May 29, 2024 (#100010383)	Carretera Num. 1, Km. 120.4; 18°00′13″N 66°33′08″W		Early 20th-century Neoclassical Revival-style bridge spanning over the Inabón River.
39	Puente Río Portugués	Puente Río Portugués	January 6, 2015 (#14001134)	Eugenio María de Hostos Avenue, spanning the historic channel of Río Portugués; 17°59′36″N 66°36′55″W	Playa	Historic Art Deco bridge from 1933 built to replace an important bridge along the Carretera Central which had been previously destroyed by flooding.
40	Rosaly–Batiz House	Rosaly–Batiz House	September 29, 1986 (#86002768)	125 Villa Street; 18°00′39″N 66°36′55″W	Primero	Italian Renaissance Palazzo house designed by Manuel V. Domenech in 1897 for the mayor of Ponce Pedro Juan Rosaly.
41	Salazar–Candal House	Salazar–Candal House	June 9, 1988 (#88000663)	53 Isabel Street; 18°00′45″N 66°36′42″W	Tercero	Distinctive Ponce Creole-style house from 1911, designed by Blas C. Silva for Dr. Guillermo Salazar Palau and his wife Sara Isabel Rivera Carbonell. Today it hosts the Ponce History Museum.
42	Subirá House	Subirá House	October 28, 1987 (#87001826)	107 Reina Street; 18°00′43″N 66°36′58″W	Segundo	Historic Ponce Creole-style house from 1910, designed by Blas C. Silva for Concepción Subirá Echevarría and her husband Manuel Frau de la Sierra.
43	Fernando Luis Toro Casa (Note: The name of the Fernando Luis Toro Casa is presented here using word order (name preceding "Casa") that conforms to the usage in the house's National Register announcement of listing and subsequent database entries.)	Fernando Luis Toro Casa	March 5, 1986 (#86000421)	3 Obispado Street, La Alhambra; 18°01′04″N 66°36′21″W	Machuelo Abajo	Historic home with eclectic architecture inspired by the Victorian, Georgian, Neo-classic, Beaux Arts, Spanish Revival and Catalan Modernist styles, designed by Francisco Porrata Doria in 1927.
44	U.S. Custom House	U.S. Custom House	February 10, 1988 (#88000073)	Junction of Bonaire and Aduana Streets; 17°58′47″N 66°37′12″W	Playa	Built in 1842, it is the oldest custom house in Puerto Rico, designed in a Spanish colonial-style possibly by Albert B. Nichols. It served as the Ponce headquarters for Nelson A. Miles during the Puerto Rico campaign of the Spanish–American War.
45	Villaronga House	Villaronga House	August 24, 1984 (#84003151)	106 Reina Street; 18°00′44″N 66°36′57″W	Segundo	Historic Classical Revival house from 1921, designed by Alfredo B. Wiechers. Today it is owned by the Institute of Puerto Rican Culture and hosts the Ponce Museum of Architecture.
46	Zaldo de Nebot Residencia (Note: The name of the Zaldo de Nebot Residencia is presented here using word order (personal name preceding "Residencia") that conforms to the usage in the house's National Register announcement of listing and subsequent database entries.)	Zaldo de Nebot Residencia	June 9, 1988 (#88000643)	27 Marina Street; 18°00′35″N 66°36′49″W	Primero	Built to a Neoclassical design in 1895, this house is one of the fullest expressions of 19th century architecture for Ponce's wealthy creole class. Notable are the trompe-l'œil interior wall paintings of Parisian landmarks and fin de siècle decorative detailing.

== Salinas ==
	Name on the Register	Image	Date listed	Location	Barrio	Description
1	Central Aguirre Historic District	Central Aguirre Historic District	October 23, 2002 (#02001208)	Highway 705, south from Highway 3, km 151.3; 17°57′20″N 66°13′29″W	Aguirre	Historic district consisting of the Central Aguirre sugar mill and neighboring company town from 1899. Many contributing buildings are a prime example of the Late 19th and Early 20th Century American Movements, particular the Traditional industrial style.

== Santa Isabel ==
	Name on the Register	Image	Date listed	Location	Barrio	Description
1	Dr. Martin G. Brumbaugh Graded School	Dr. Martin G. Brumbaugh Graded School	February 4, 2011 (#10001217)	33 Eugenio M. de Hostos Street; 17°58′04″N 66°24′15″W	Santa Isabel Pueblo	Historic school building from 1906.
22	Iglesia Cristiana	Iglesia Cristiana	May 29, 2024 (#100010384)	110 Luis Muñoz Rivera Street; 17°57′52″N 66°24′17″W	Santa Isabel Pueblo	Mission/Spanish Colonial-style representing a breakaway in both religious and architectural norms of the time, being the first Protestant church to be built in a main town square (plaza) in Puerto Rico.
3	Sistema de riego de las tres haciendas		December 13, 2016 (#16000853)	Linear district roughly parallel to Highway 153, between Highway 52 to the north and Highway 1 to the south 17°58′47″N 66°23′23″W	Boca Velázquez, Jauca II, Felicia II, Felicia I, Santa Isabel Pueblo	Historic irrigation system built to transport water from the Coamo River to the Hacienda Santa Isabel, Florida and El Destino sugarcane plantations.

== Yauco ==
	Name on the Register	Image	Date listed	Location	Barrio	Description
1	Casa Agostini	Casa Agostini	June 9, 1988 (#88000682)	Dr. Gatell Street, between Santiago Vivaldi and Comercio Streets; 18°02′04″N 66°50′53″W	Yauco Pueblo	A Classical Revival building designed by Miguel Briganti Pinti as both a residence and coffee warehouse for Corsican immigrant Jose Maria Agostini Santini.
2	Casa Franceschi Antongiorgi	Casa Franceschi Antongiorgi	January 16, 1985 (#85000113)	Junction of 25th of July Street and Barbosa Street; 18°02′01″N 66°50′55″W	Yauco Pueblo	A Beaux Arts-style house from 1907. Also known as the Flemming House.
3	Casona Césari	Casona Césari	January 16, 1985 (#85000114)	25th of July Street; 18°02′00″N 66°51′05″W	Yauco Pueblo	Historic Puerto Rican creole vernacular house designed by Antonio Mattei Lluberas and built by built in 1893 by Angelo Cesari Poggi in 1893.
4	Chalet Amill	Chalet Amill	January 16, 1985 (#85000115)	33 Mattei Lluveras Street; 18°02′08″N 66°51′00″W	Yauco Pueblo	Historic Beaux Arts house built in 1914 for Angel Antongiorgi Paoli. It formerly served as a hotel.
5	Filardi House	Filardi House	January 16, 1985 (#85000116)	Junction of 25th of July Street and Baldorioty Street; 18°02′00″N 66°51′00″W	Yauco Pueblo	This 1916 house is notable for its extensive use of concrete sculptural ornamentation. Juan Bautista and Domingo Filardi integrated the outstanding decorative features with the overall Beaux-Arts plan, (Note: Juan Bautista and Domingo Filardi's father, Vicente Filardi, was the general contractor with overall responsibility for design and construction for the Filardi House.) and later came to be recognized as experts in cast concrete ornamental elements.
6	Logia Masónica Hijos de la Luz	Logia Masónica Hijos de la Luz	June 9, 1988 (#88000684)	José Celso Barbosa Avenue; 18°01′55″N 66°50′54″W	Yauco Pueblo	Possibly the first or at least oldest masonic lodge in Puerto Rico, it was designed in the Classical Revival-style by André Troublard and built by Jesus Emmanuelli in 1894.
7	Public Health Unit at Yauco		October 14, 2021 (#100007078)	64 Comercio St. 18°02′05″N 66°51′13″W	Yauco Pueblo	Historic community health services unit building built in 1937 in the Spanish Revival-style.
8	Residencia González Vivaldi	Residencia González Vivaldi	February 5, 1987 (#86003201)	26 Mattei Lluveras Street; 18°02′09″N 66°50′53″W	Yauco Pueblo	Vernacular Creole-style house from 1880 with elements of Art Nouveau.
9	Teatro Ideal	Teatro Ideal	June 9, 1988 (#88000683)	Comercio Street; 18°02′05″N 66°50′54″W	Yauco Pueblo	Early 20th-century eclectic historic theater located in the main town square of Yauco.

== See also ==
- National Register of Historic Places listings in Puerto Rico
  - National Register of Historic Places listings in northern Puerto Rico
  - National Register of Historic Places listings in western Puerto Rico
  - National Register of Historic Places listings in central Puerto Rico
  - National Register of Historic Places listings in eastern Puerto Rico
  - National Register of Historic Places listings in San Juan, Puerto Rico
- Historic preservation
- History of Puerto Rico
