= Teatro Ideal =

- U.S. National Register of Historic Places
- Puerto Rico Historic Sites and Zones
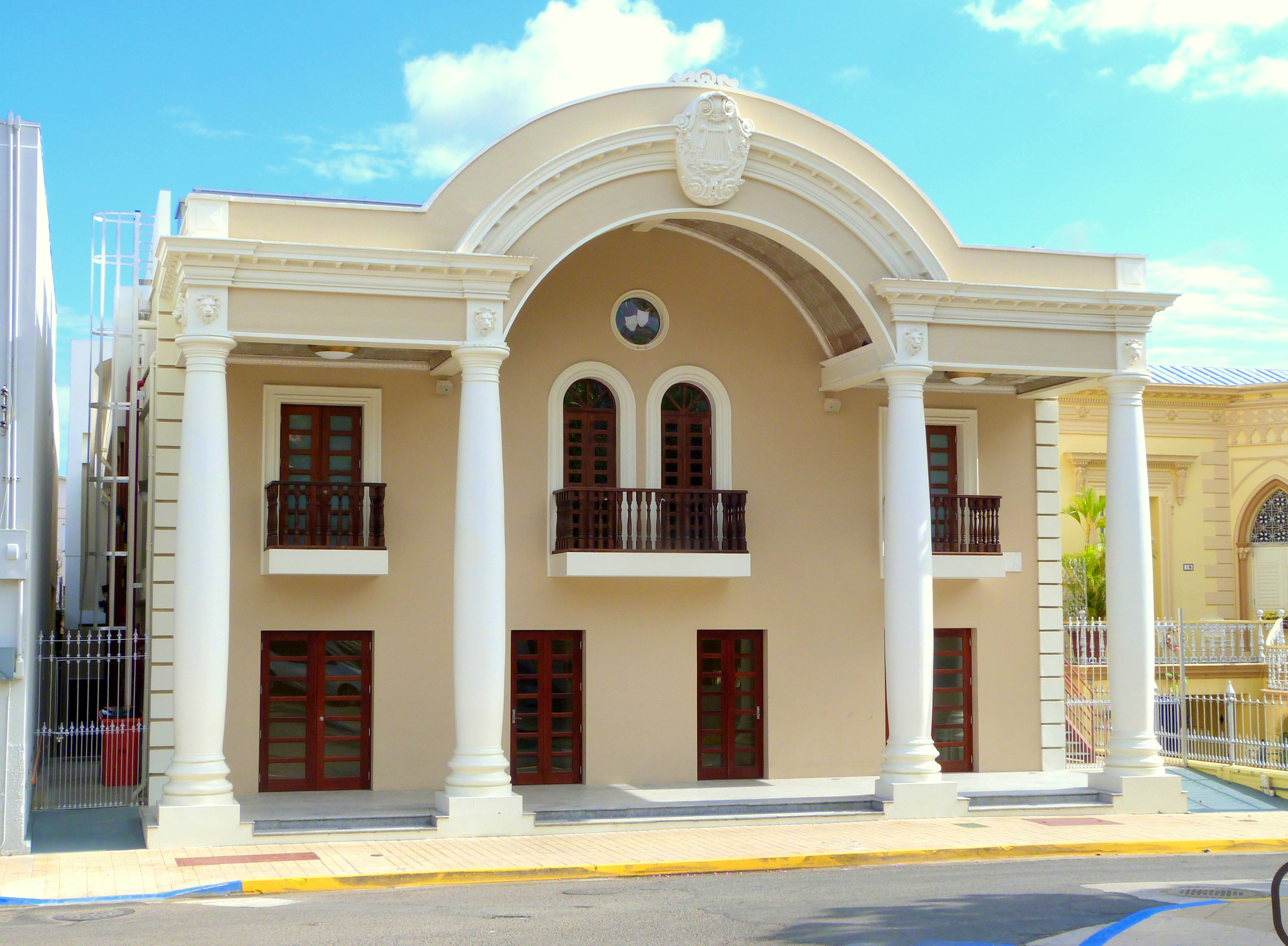
- The theater in 2017.

- Location within Puerto Rico
- Location: Comerío Street across the main town square of Yauco, Puerto Rico
- Coordinates: 18°02′04″N 66°50′53″W
- Built: 1926
- Architect: Jesús Buil Lluveras
- Architectural style: Early 20th-century eclectic
- NRHP reference No.: 88000683
- RNSZH No.: 2001-(RS)-23-JP-SH

Significant dates
- Added to NRHP: June 9, 1988
- Designated RNSZH: May 16, 2001

Teatro Ideal, also known as La Plaza Theater (Spanish: Teatro de La Plaza), is a historic theater and performing arts venue located in the main town square (plaza pública) of Yauco Pueblo, the administrative and historic center of the municipality of Yauco, Puerto Rico. The theater was added to the National Register of Historic Places in 1988, and to the Puerto Rico Register of Historic Sites and Zones in 2001.

== Background ==
The theater, originally built in 1926 as a movie theater for the Yauco Moving Picture Company, is a two-storey Broadway-type eclectic-style structure with monumental Tuscan columns with Roman amphora crowns that support the rainbow arch and roof which extends over the structure's façade. Although originally intended as a movie theater the venue soon became more popular in the 1920s and 1930s for zarzuelas, operettas and concerts by international musical artists such as by Argentine singer and composer Carlos Gardel. The venue also became popular for political assemblies by figures such as Antonio Rafael Barceló and Luis Muñoz Rivera, and for poetry readings by figures such as Francisco Villaespesa, Luis Lloréns Torres, Evaristo Ribera Chevremont and José Gordils. The theater was eventually closed and partially fell into disrepair until it opened after undergoing renovations between 2000 and 2012. The theater today hosts plays in addition to local events.

== See also ==
- National Register of Historic Places listings in southern Puerto Rico
