= Residencia González Vivaldi =

Historic house in Yauco, Puerto Rico

- U.S. National Register of Historic Places
- Puerto Rico Historic Sites and Zones
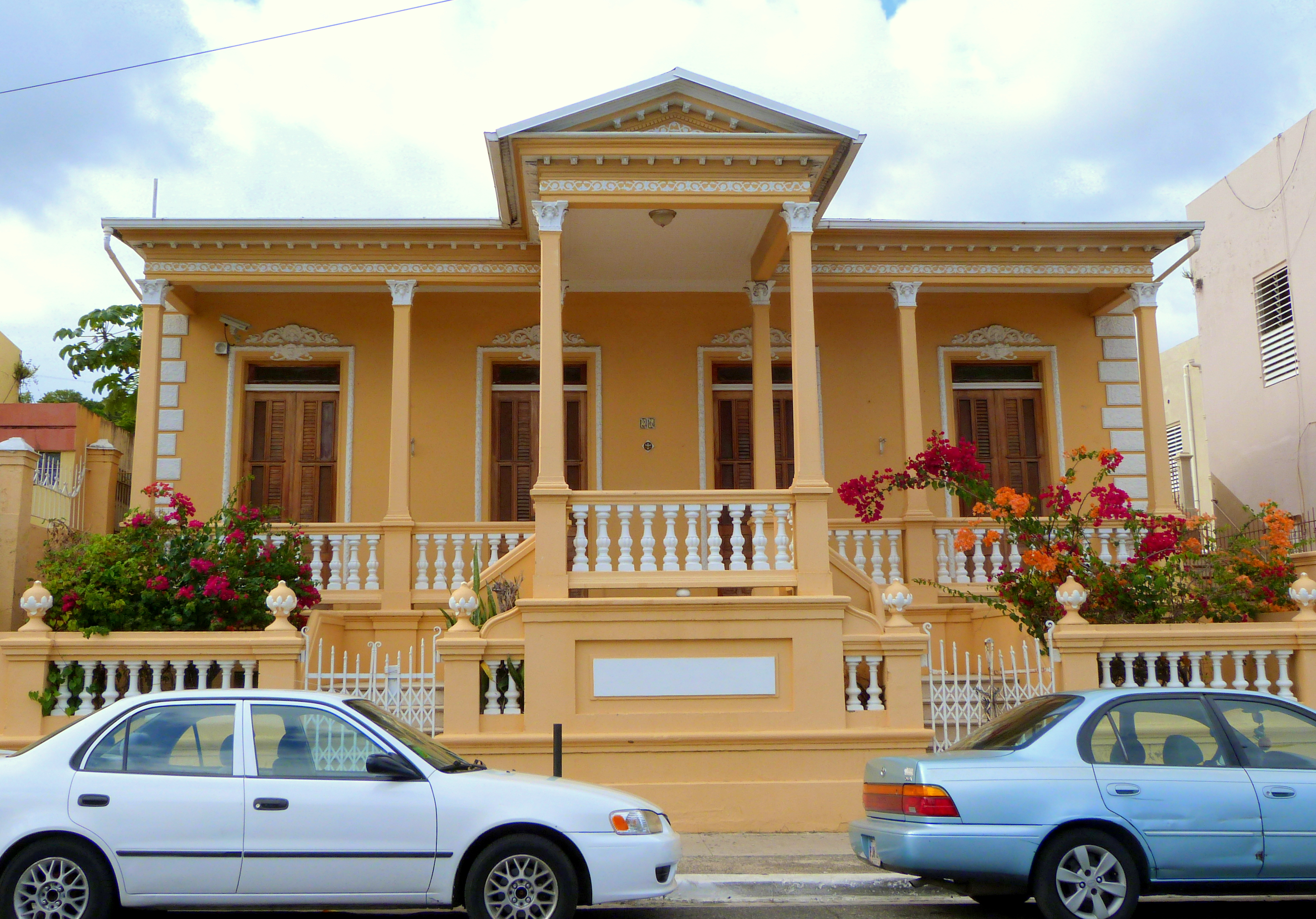
- The house in 2017.

- Location within Puerto Rico
- Location: 26 Mattei Lluberas Street Yauco, Puerto Rico
- Coordinates: 18°02′09″N 66°50′54″W
- Built: 1880
- Architectural style: Criollo vernacular
- NRHP reference No.: 86003201
- RNSZH No.: 2001-(RS)-23-JP-SH

Significant dates
- Added to NRHP: February 5, 1987
- Designated RNSZH: May 16, 2001

The González Vivaldi Residence (Spanish: Residencia González Vivaldi) is a late 19th-century historic house located in Yauco Pueblo, the administrative and historic center of the municipality of Yauco, Puerto Rico. The house was built in 1880 in the traditional Criollo vernacular style with elements of Neoclassical and Art Nouveau architecture that was typical to the private residences of wealthy landowners of the region at the time. The structure combines masonry and wood, with well-preserved wooden interiors that have not been altered since its construction. The house was added to the National Register of Historic Places in 1987 and to the Puerto Rico Register of Historic Sites and Zones in 2001.

== Gallery ==
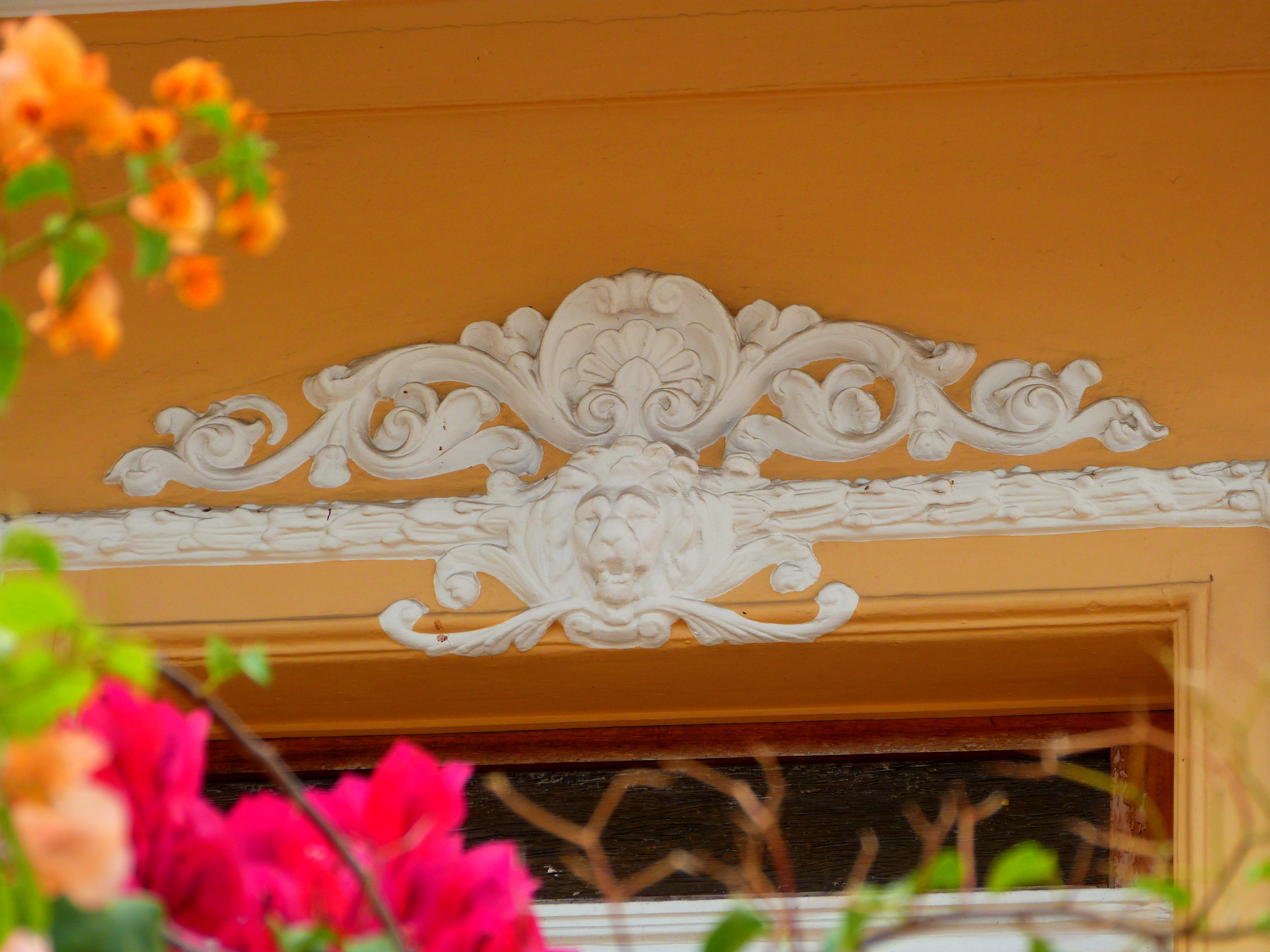
Ornamental details

== See also ==
- Corsican immigration to Puerto Rico
- National Register of Historic Places listings in southern Puerto Rico
