= Edificio Municipal de la Playa de Ponce =

- U.S. National Register of Historic Places
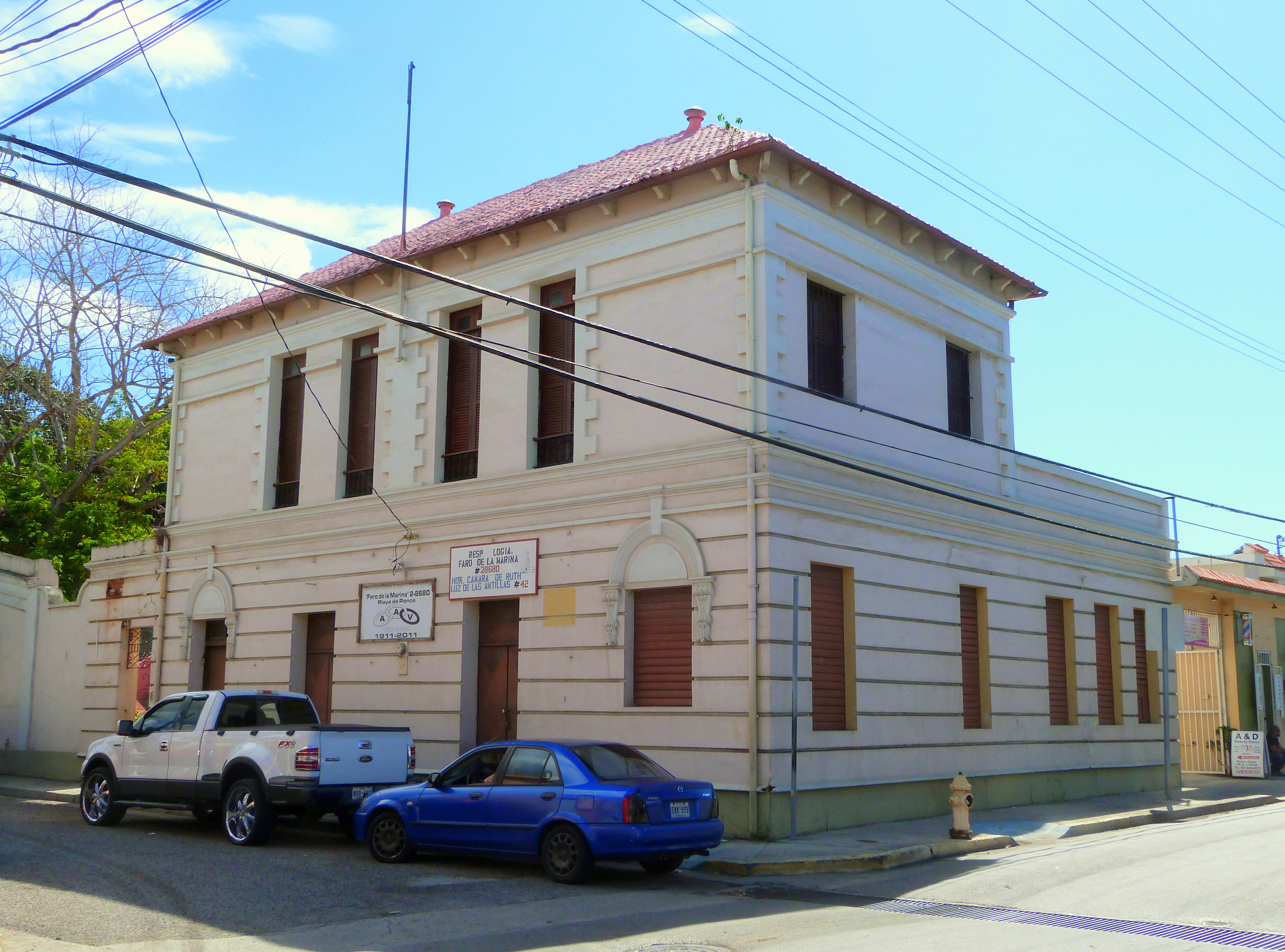
- The former Municipal Building in 2010.

- Location within Puerto Rico
- Location: 28 Alfonso XII Street at Padre Noel Avenue Ponce, Puerto Rico
- Coordinates: 17°58′55″N 66°37′16″W
- Built: 1904
- Architect: Manuel V. Domenech and Victor A. Auffant
- Architectural style: Spanish Revival
- NRHP reference No.: 13000639
- Added to NRHP: August 27, 2013

The Municipal Building of Ponce Playa (Spanish: Edificio Municipal de la Playa de Ponce or Ponce Playa) is a historic building and former civic center and municipal offices of the Playa barrio (Ponce Playa) of the city of Ponce, Puerto Rico. The municipal building was intended to serve the Ponce Playa settlement which had significantly grown thanks to the economic and industrial activities of the Port of Ponce. It was designed by engineer Manuel V. Domenech and municipal chief engineer Victor A. Auffant in a Renaissance-inspired Spanish Revival style and built in 1904. It hosted municipal offices in addition to a police station, jailhouse and fire station. It also provided social services to the local community such as first aid and civic offices. Although the building is no longer in official municipal use it was added to the National Register of Historic Places in 2013 due to its architectural and local historic significance.

== See also ==
- National Register of Historic Places listings in southern Puerto Rico
