= Edificio Empresas Ferré =

- U.S. National Register of Historic Places
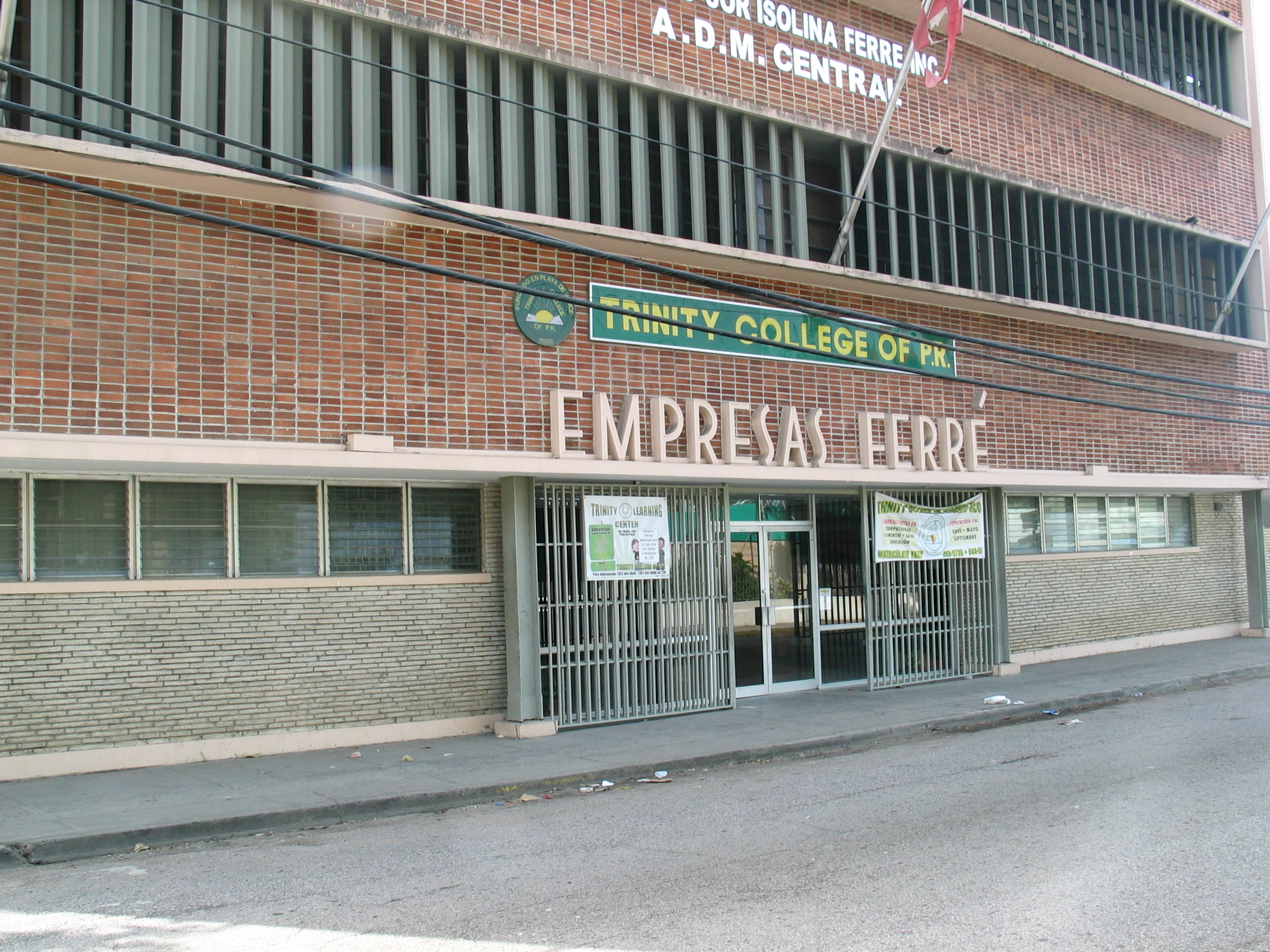
- Building entrance in 2010.

- Location within Puerto Rico
- Location: 834 Eugenio María de Hostos Avenue Ponce, Puerto Rico
- Coordinates: 17°58′54″N 66°37′12″W
- Built: 1953
- Architect: Robert M. Little
- Architectural style: International
- NRHP reference No.: 13000638
- Added to NRHP: August 27, 2013

Edificio Empresas Ferré (Spanish for 'Ferré Enterprises building'), today known as the Centros Sor Isolina Ferré Building, is a historic mid 20th-century International-style building located in the Ponce Playa area in the city of Ponce, Puerto Rico. It was designed by architect Robert M. Little as both workshop facilities and the administrative offices of Ferré Enterprises (Empresas Ferré), founded by Luis A. Ferré and the parent company of enterprises such as Ponce Cement and Puerto Rico Iron Works that boomed during the rapid industrialization period of Operation Bootstrap (Operación Manos a la Obra) in the aftermath of World War II.

The building also hosts La Fundición, a mural painted by famed muralist Rafael Ríos Rey in 1953. Both the building and the mural were listed in the National Register of Historic Places in 2013 due to their architectural, artistic and historic significance. Edificio Empresas Ferré today hosts the Trinity College of Puerto Rico.

== See also ==
- Architecture of Puerto Rico
- National Register of Historic Places listings in southern Puerto Rico
