= Escuela Hemeterio Colón y Warens =

- Ponce Public School 1913
- U.S. National Register of Historic Places
- Location within Puerto Rico
- Location: Calle Concordia; Ponce, Puerto Rico
- Coordinates: 18°00′27″N 66°36′53″W
- Built: 1913
- Architect: Albert B. McCulloch
- Architectural style: Mission Revival, Classical Revival
- MPS: Early Twentieth Century Schools in Puerto Rico TR
- NRHP reference No.: 100008052
- Added to NRHP: August 23, 2022

The Escuela Hemeterio Colón y Warens (English: Hemeterio Colón y Warens School), also widely referred to as La Hemeterio or La Colón, is a public, intermediate school serving the city of Ponce, Puerto Rico. Its original, main building, built in 1913, is architecturally significant as a well-preserved example of the Puerto Rican school buildings of the early 20th century, a period of great transformation in Puerto Rico under the American administration. It was designed by insular architect Albert B. McCulloch using the California Mission Revival and Classical Revival styles, as well as some Modernist elements associated with the work of Antonin Nechodoma.

The school was entered on the U.S. National Register of Historic Places in 2022.

== See also ==
- National Register of Historic Places listings in southern Puerto Rico
