= Padre Nazario School =

Historic place in Guayanilla, Puerto Rico

- U.S. National Register of Historic Places
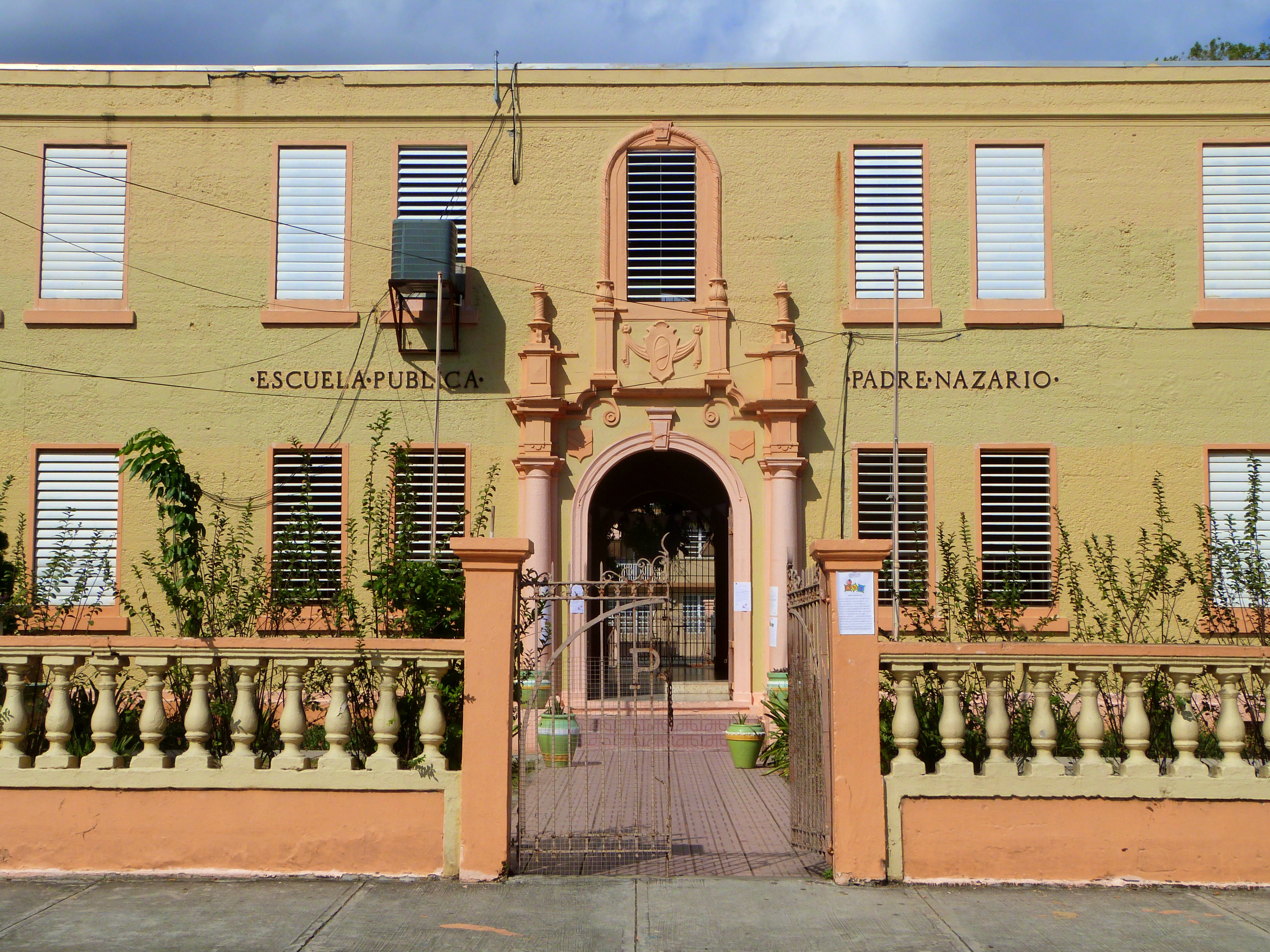
- The school in 2017

- Location within Puerto Rico
- Location: 4 Concepción Street; Guayanilla, Puerto Rico
- Coordinates: 18°01′08″N 66°47′25″W
- Built: 1925–1926
- Architectural style: Neoclassical, Spanish Colonial Revival
- MPS: Early 20th Century Schools in Puerto Rico MPS
- NRHP reference No.: 12000936
- Added to NRHP: November 14, 2012

The Padre Nazario School (Spanish: Escuela Padre Nazario) is a historic public school in Guayanilla, Puerto Rico. Completed in 1926, it epitomizes the monumental schools built in Puerto Rico during the early 20th century. Its Neoclassical and Spanish Revival details at the entry and spatial sequence of the vestibule are exceptional design features. It is named for José María Nazario y Cancel, a long-serving and prominent priest of the Guayanilla parish and discoverer of the Nazario Collection of ancient carved stones.

The school was entered on the National Register of Historic Places in 2012.

== See also ==
- National Register of Historic Places listings in southern Puerto Rico
