= Chalet Amill =

Historic building in Yauco, Puerto Rico

- U.S. National Register of Historic Places
- Puerto Rico Historic Sites and Zones
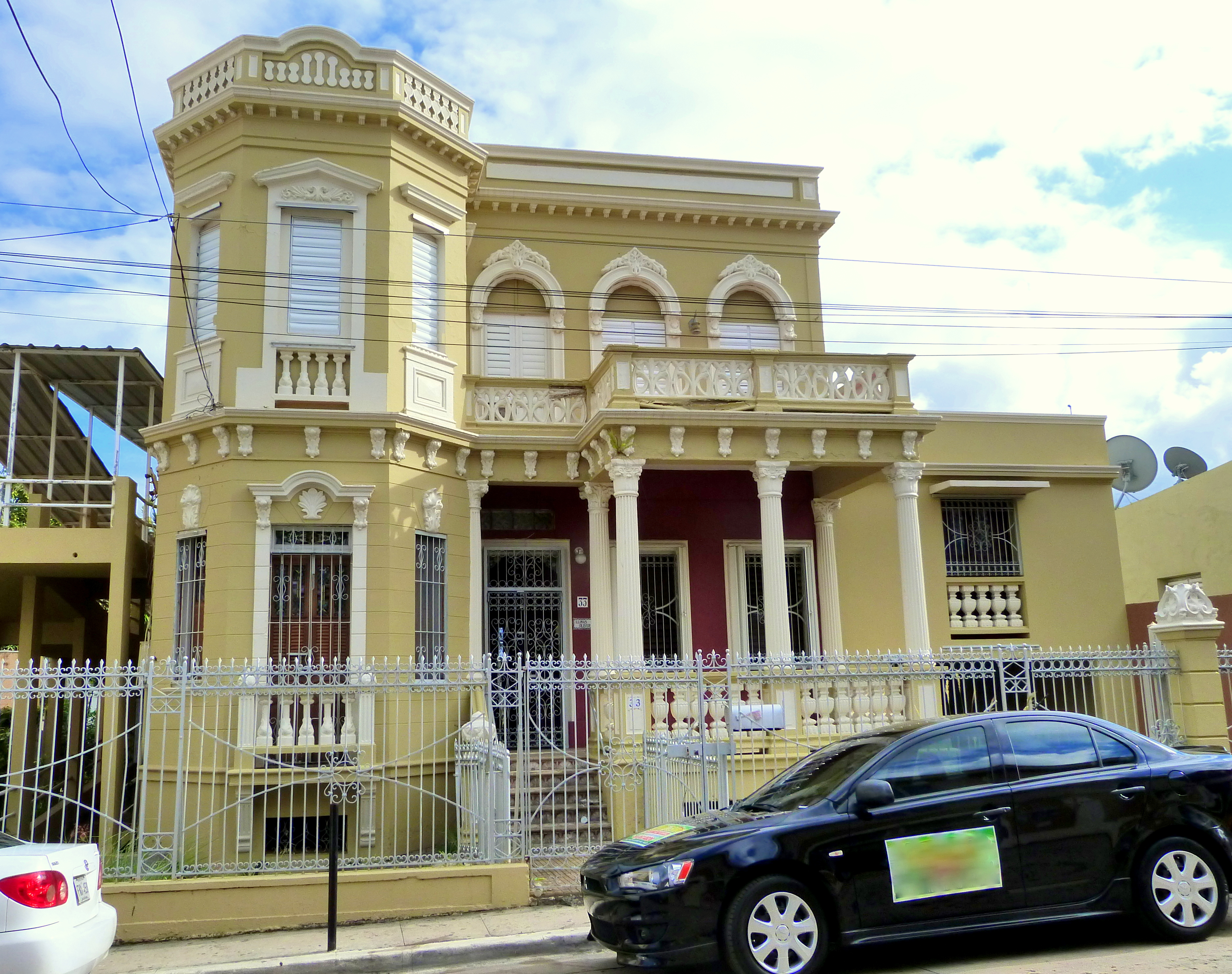
- Chalet Amill in 2017

- Location within Puerto Rico
- Location: 33 Mattei Lluveras Street; Yauco, Puerto Rico
- Coordinates: 18°02′08″N 66°51′00″W
- Area: 0.2 acres (0.081 ha)
- Built: 1914
- Architect: Santoni, Tomas Olivari
- Architectural style: Beaux Arts
- NRHP reference No.: 85000115
- RNSZH No.: 2001-(RS)-23-JP-SH

Significant dates
- Added to NRHP: January 16, 1985
- Designated RNSZH: May 16, 2001

The Chalet Amill in Yauco, Puerto Rico is a Beaux Arts style house that was built in 1914. It was listed on the National Register of Historic Places in 1985, and on the Puerto Rico Register of Historic Sites and Zones in 2001.

It was built for Corsican immigrant Angel Antongiorgi Paoli, was given to his daughter and new husband in 1918, and was later converted to a hotel.

== See also ==
- National Register of Historic Places listings in Yauco, Puerto Rico
