= Neoclásico Isabelino =

Puerto Rican architectural style

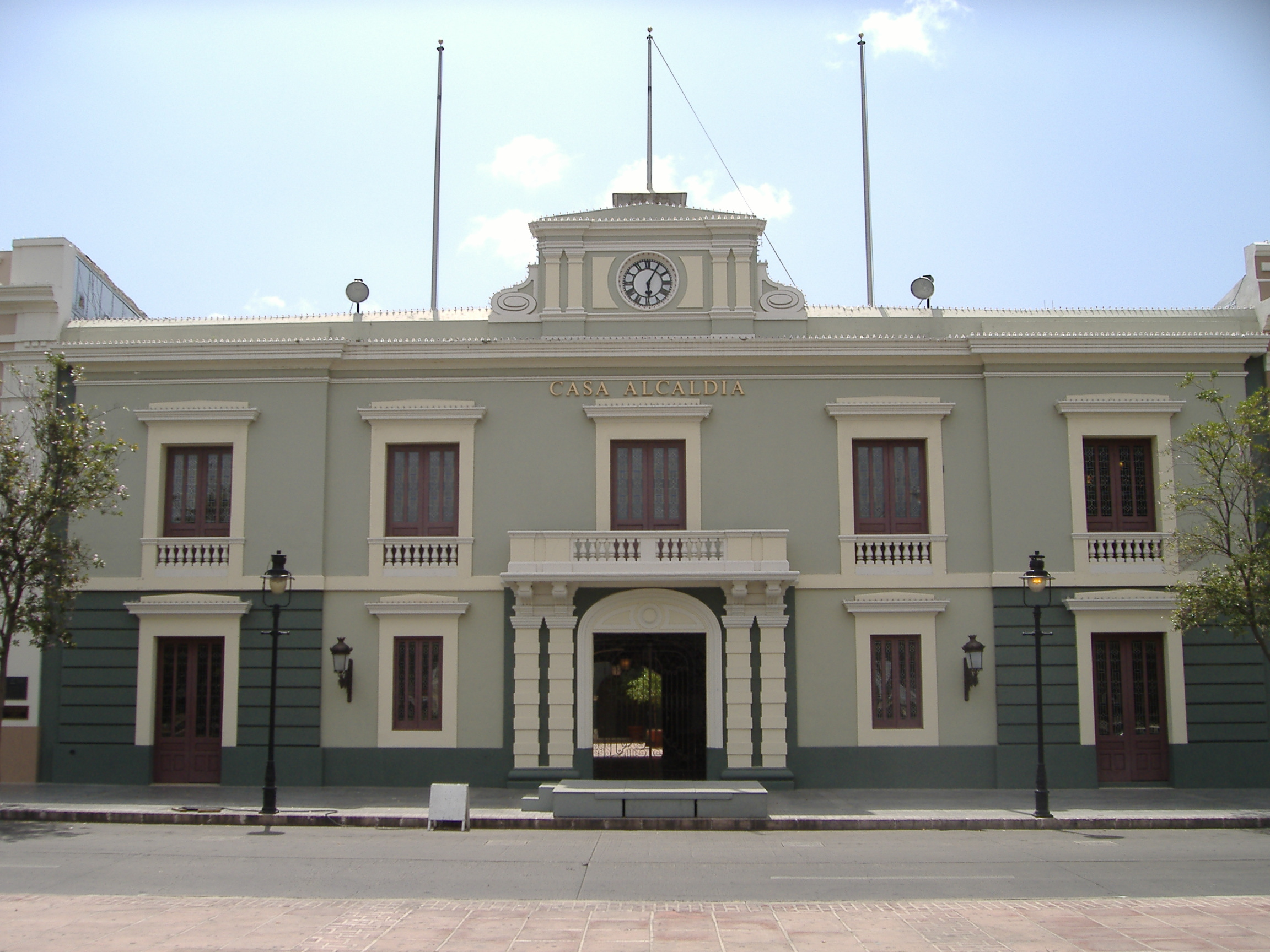
Ponce City Hall

Neoclasico Isabelino is an architectural style that applies to houses and other buildings in Puerto Rico. These include a number of buildings in Ponce that are listed on the U.S. National Register of Historic Places:

- Albergue Caritativo Tricoche
- Antiguo Cuartel Militar Español de Ponce
- Antiguo Hospital Militar Español de Ponce
- Casa Alcaldía de Ponce-City Hall

Manuel V. Domenech, an architect from Isabela, Puerto Rico, was one of the architects who designed in this style, having designed, among others, the Puerto Rico Courthouse for the Ponce judicial district.

== See also ==
- List of architectural styles
- Ponce Creole
