= Eleuterio Derkes Grammar School =

Historic building in Guayama, Puerto Rico

- U.S. National Register of Historic Places
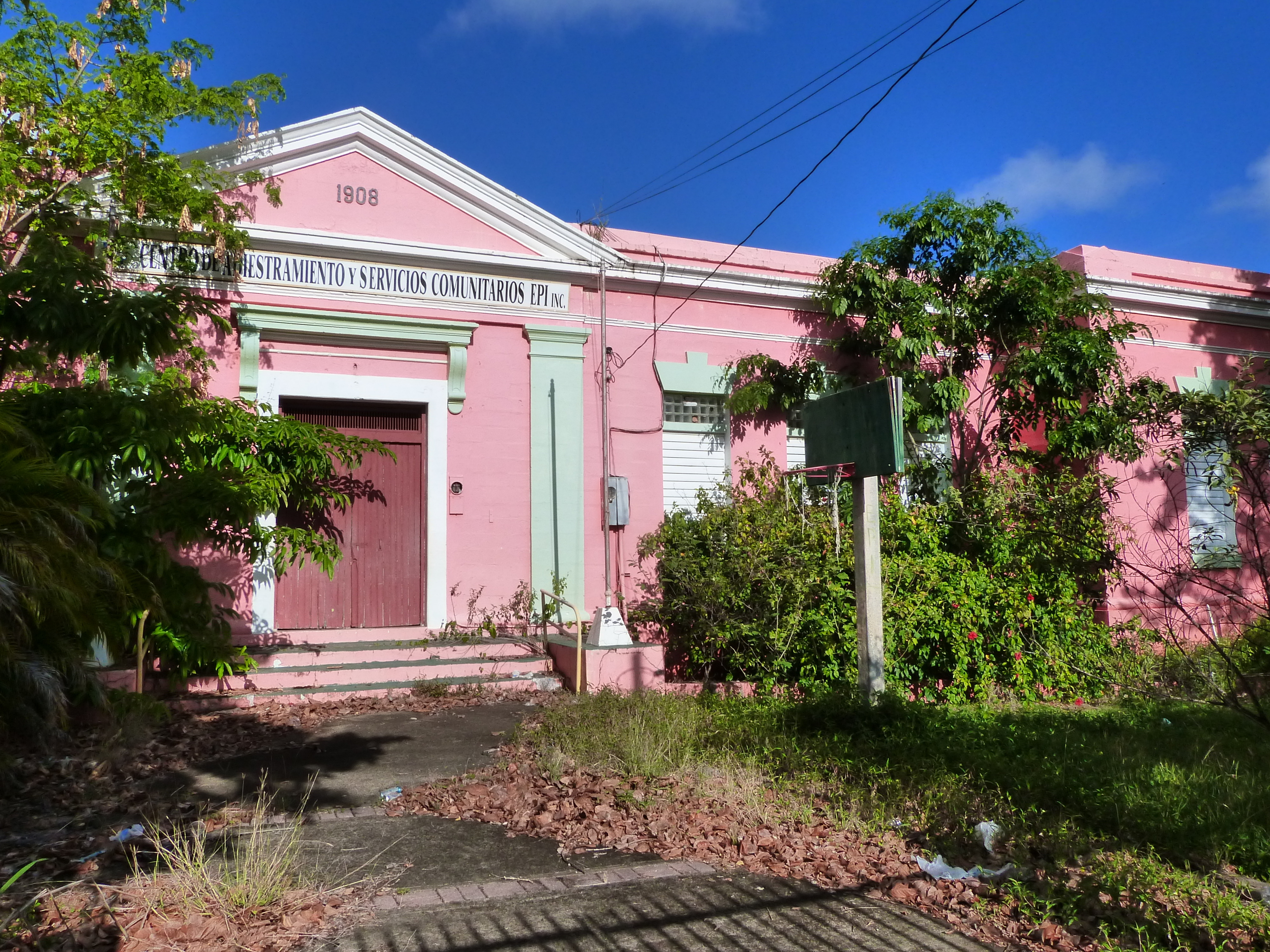
- The school in 2017

- Location within Puerto Rico
- Location: José María Anguelí Street; Guayama, Puerto Rico
- Coordinates: 17°58′55″N 66°06′42″W
- Built: 1908
- Built by: Antonio Higuera
- Architectural style: Neoclassical
- MPS: Early Twentieth Century Schools in Puerto Rico TR
- NRHP reference No.: 87001312
- Added to NRHP: August 4, 1987

The Eleuterio Derkes Grammar School (Spanish: Escuela Derkes) is a historic school building in Guayama, Puerto Rico. It was built in 1908, during a period when schools were gaining importance as civic institutions in Puerto Rico. Its simplified Neoclassical design emphasized this shift, and it became a prototype for a generation of school construction on the island. It additionally signifies a transition in construction technologies from wood to concrete. In 1987, architect Jorge Rigau observed that the building had survived in a nearly unaltered state, a rarity among schools of its era.

It was inscribed on the National Register of Historic Places in 1987.

== See also ==
- National Register of Historic Places listings in southern Puerto Rico
