= Zaldo de Nebot Residence =

Historic house in Ponce, Puerto Rico

- Zaldo de Nebot Residencia (Note: The name of the Zaldo de Nebot Residencia is presented here using word order (personal name preceding "Residencia") that conforms to the usage in the house's National Register announcement of listing and subsequent database entries.)
- U.S. National Register of Historic Places
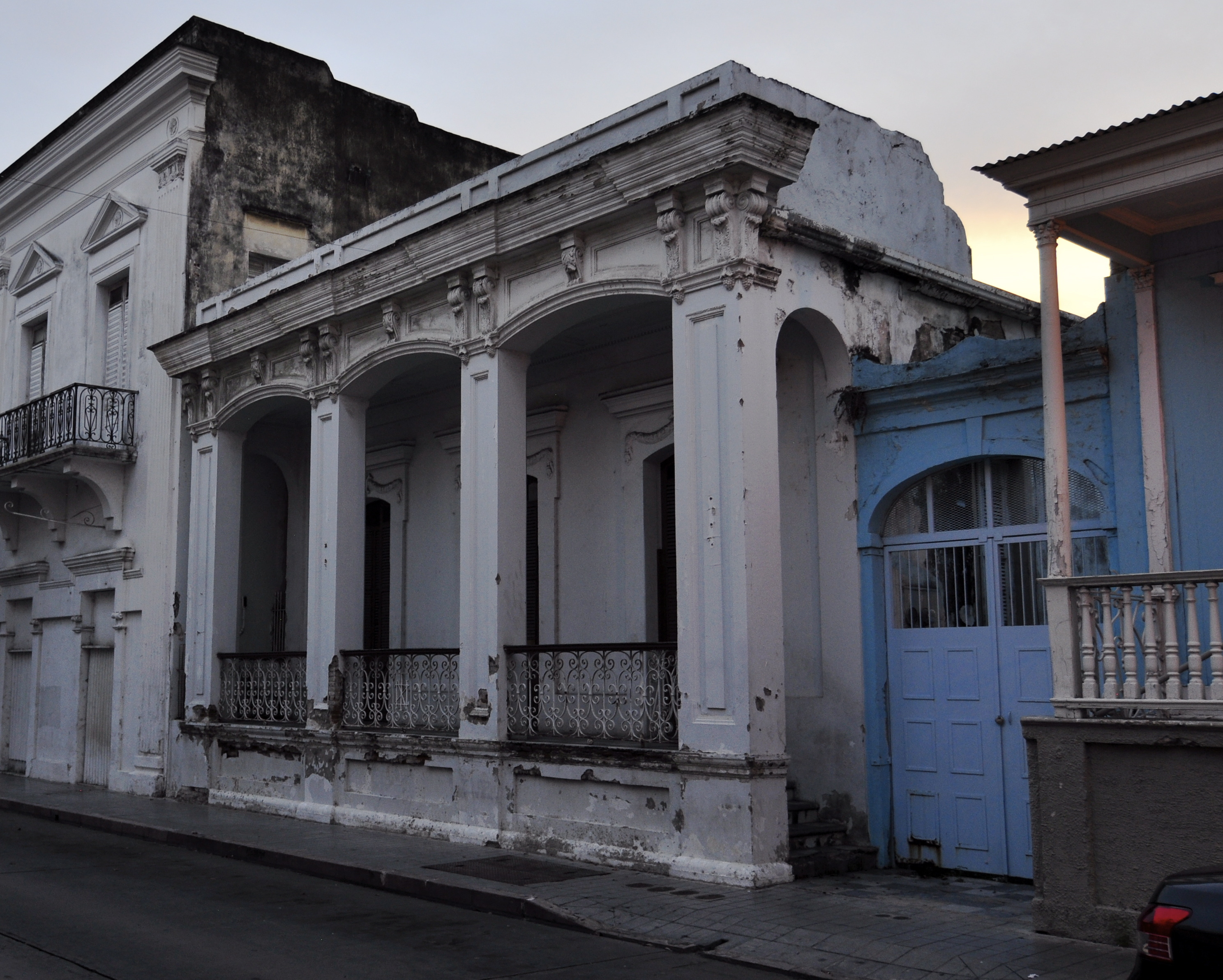
- The house in 2012

- Location within Puerto Rico
- Location: 27 Marina Street; Ponce, Puerto Rico
- Coordinates: 18°00′35″N 66°36′49″W
- Built: 1895
- Built by: Elías Concepción
- Architectural style: Neoclassical
- NRHP reference No.: 88000643
- Added to NRHP: June 9, 1988

The Zaldo de Nebot Residence (Spanish: Residencia Zaldo de Nebot), also known as the Fornaris Residence, is a historic house in Ponce, Puerto Rico. Built to a Neoclassical design in 1895, it is one of the fullest expressions of 19th century architecture for Ponce's wealthy creole class. Notable are the trompe-l'œil interior wall paintings of Parisian landmarks and fin de siècle decorative detailing.

The house was entered on the National Register of Historic Places in 1988.

== See also ==
- National Register of Historic Places listings in Ponce, Puerto Rico
