= Casa Miguel C. Godreau =

Historic house in Ponce, Puerto Rico

- U.S. National Register of Historic Places
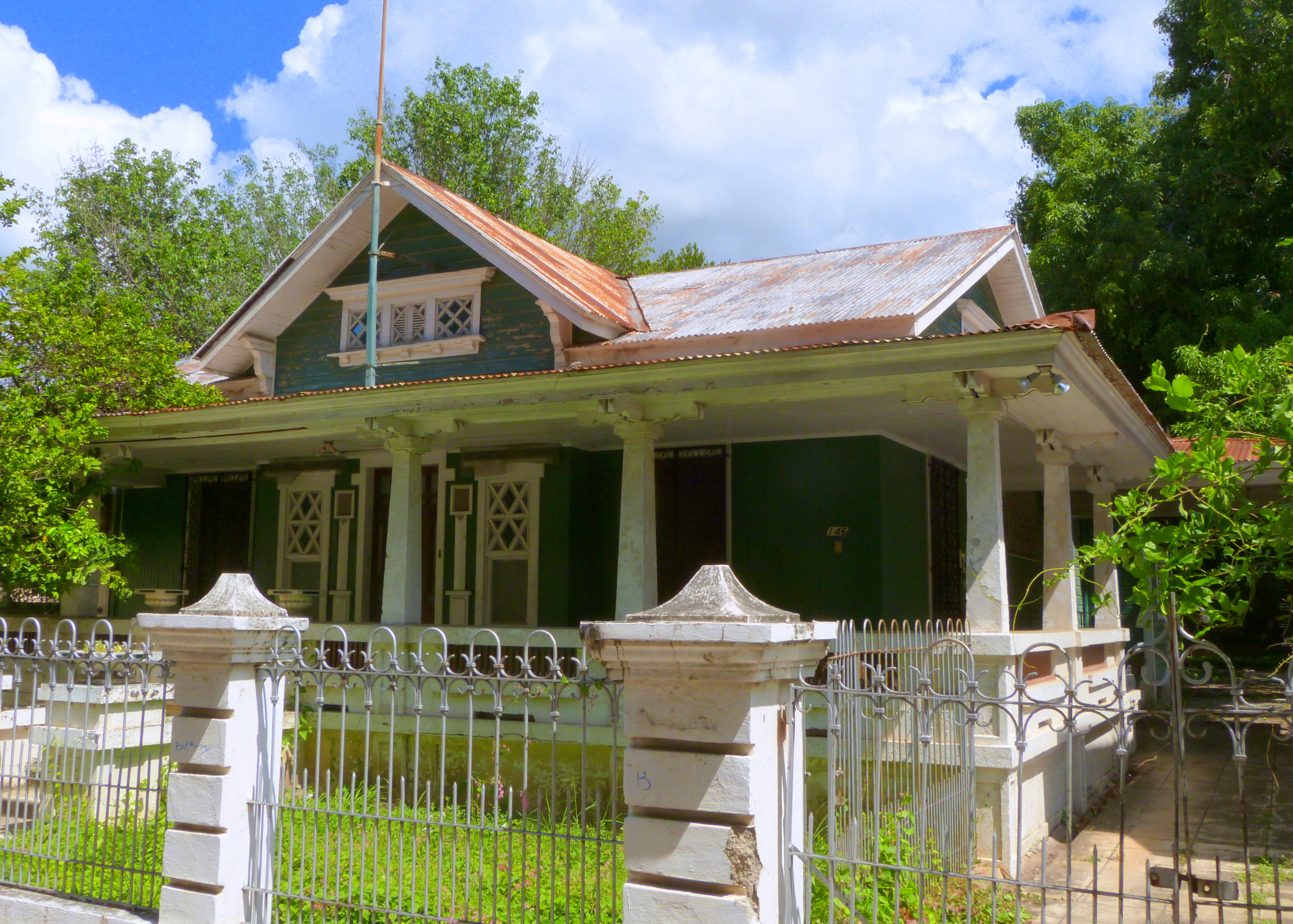
- Casa Godreau in 2017.

- Location within Puerto Rico
- Location: 146 Reina Duarte Street Ponce, Puerto Rico
- Coordinates: 18°00′44″N 66°37′06″W
- Built: 1919
- Architect: Julio Conesa, Julio Morales
- NRHP reference No.: 86000894
- Added to NRHP: April 30, 1986

The Miguel C. Godreau House (Spanish: Casa Miguel C. Godreau) is a historic residence located in the historic zone of the municipality of Ponce, Puerto Rico. The house was designed by architects Julio Conesa and Julio Morales and was built in 1919. It was listed in the National Register of Historic Places (NRHP) in 1986.

== Architecture ==
The house was designed by engineers Julio Conesa and Julio Morales and built in 1919 at 146 Reina Duarte Street as a wedding present for Conesa's friend Miguel C. Godreau and his wife Leonina Godreau. The house was designed in a unique eclectic style that was foreign at the time in Ponce, during a time where the Neoclassical and the Ponce Creole architectures were the most popular style in the city and the wider region. At the time of the NRHP-designation the house was still owned and lived by Mrs. Godreau. The simple but elegant façade has preserved its style and dark forest green color since its construction with the roofing of the balcony area being the only alteration made to the original design.

== Gallery ==
House details in 1985

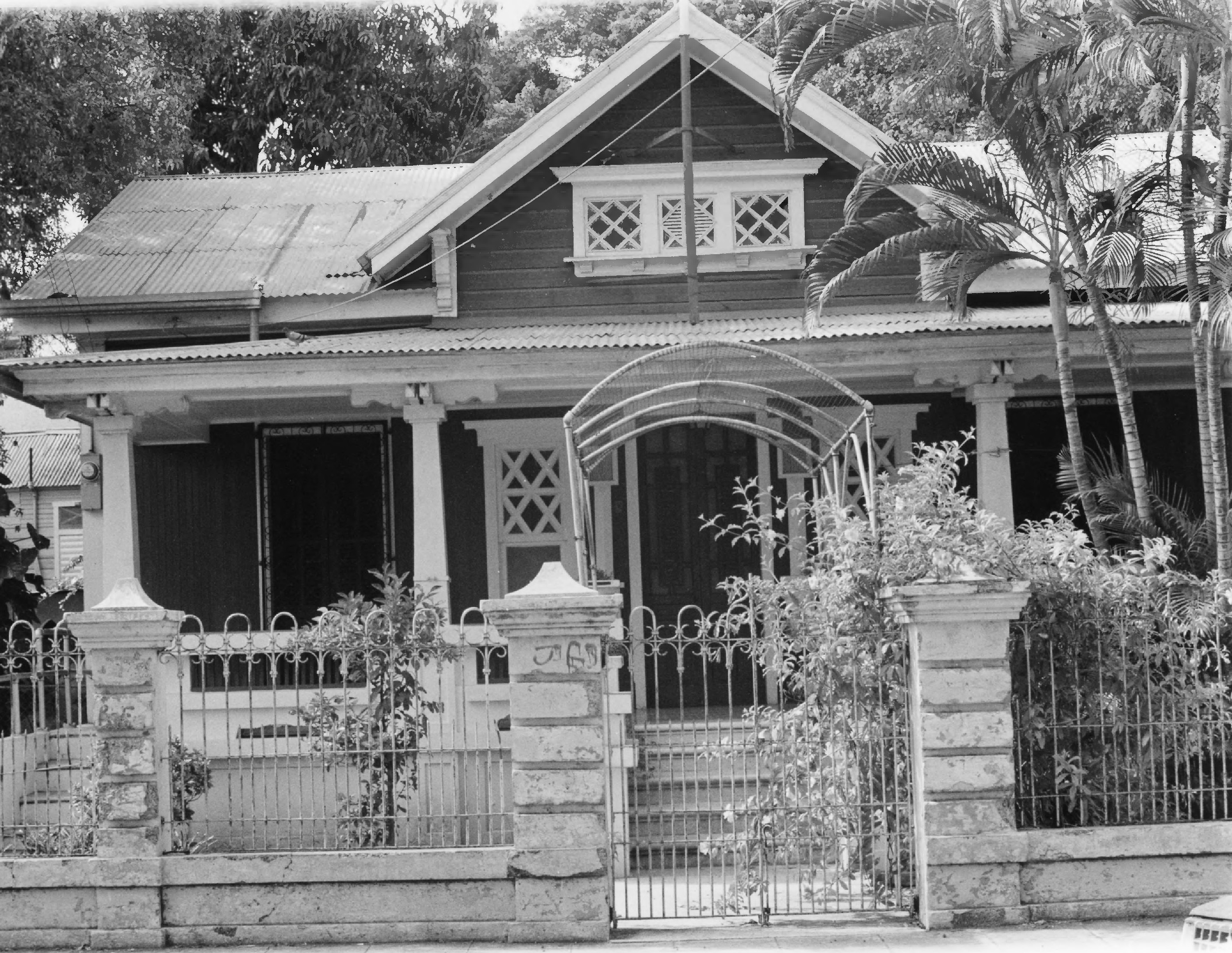

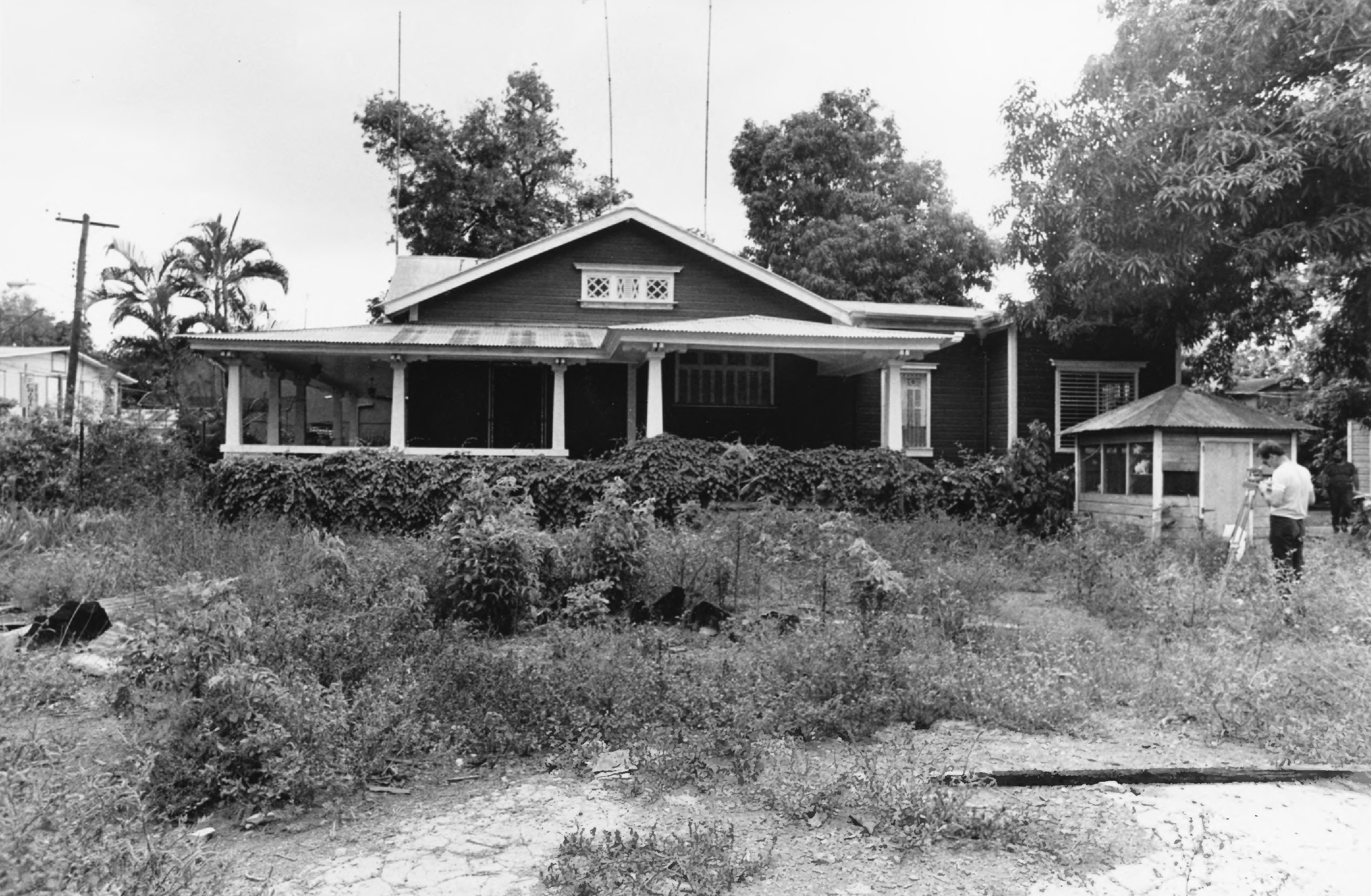

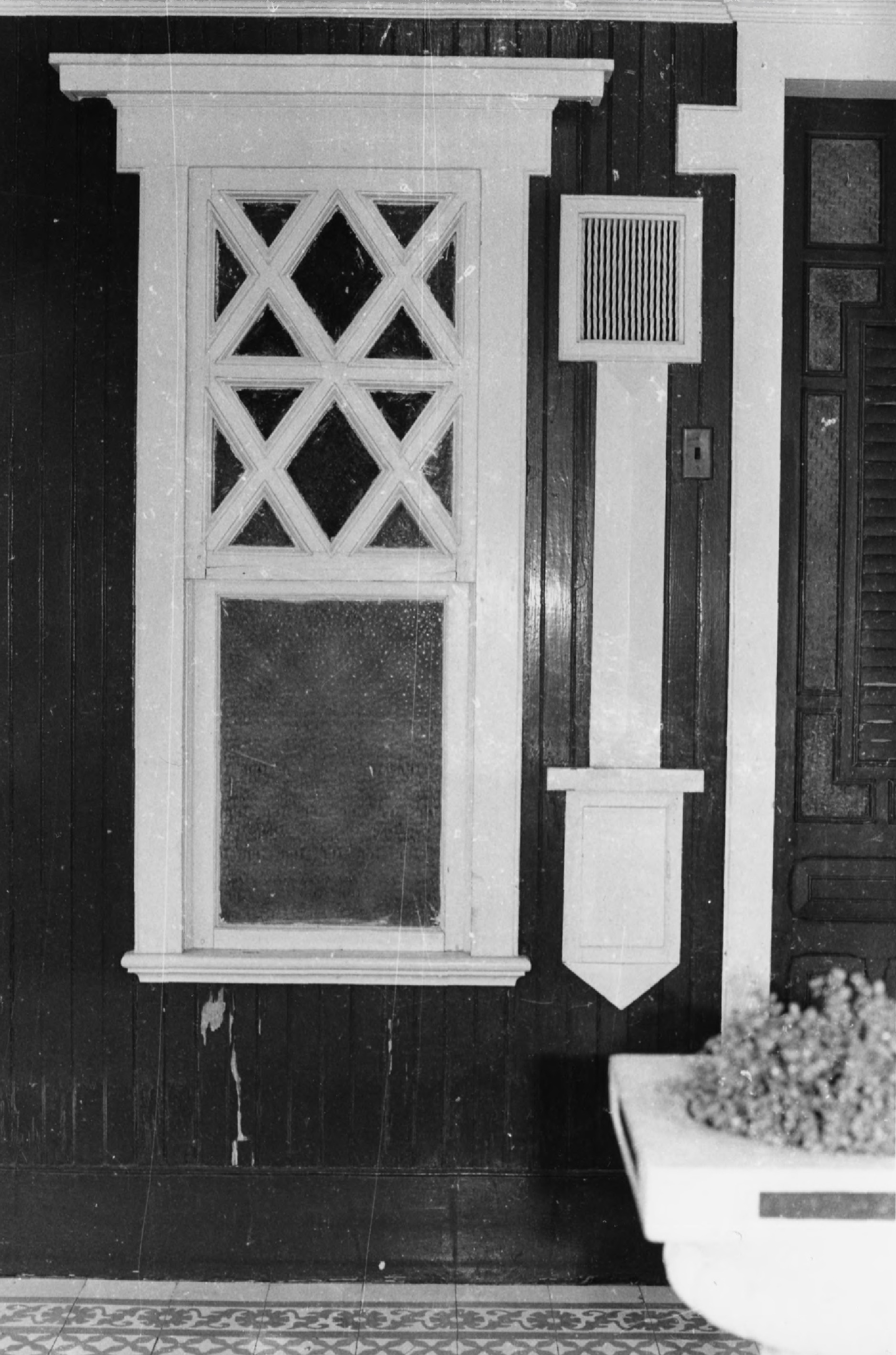

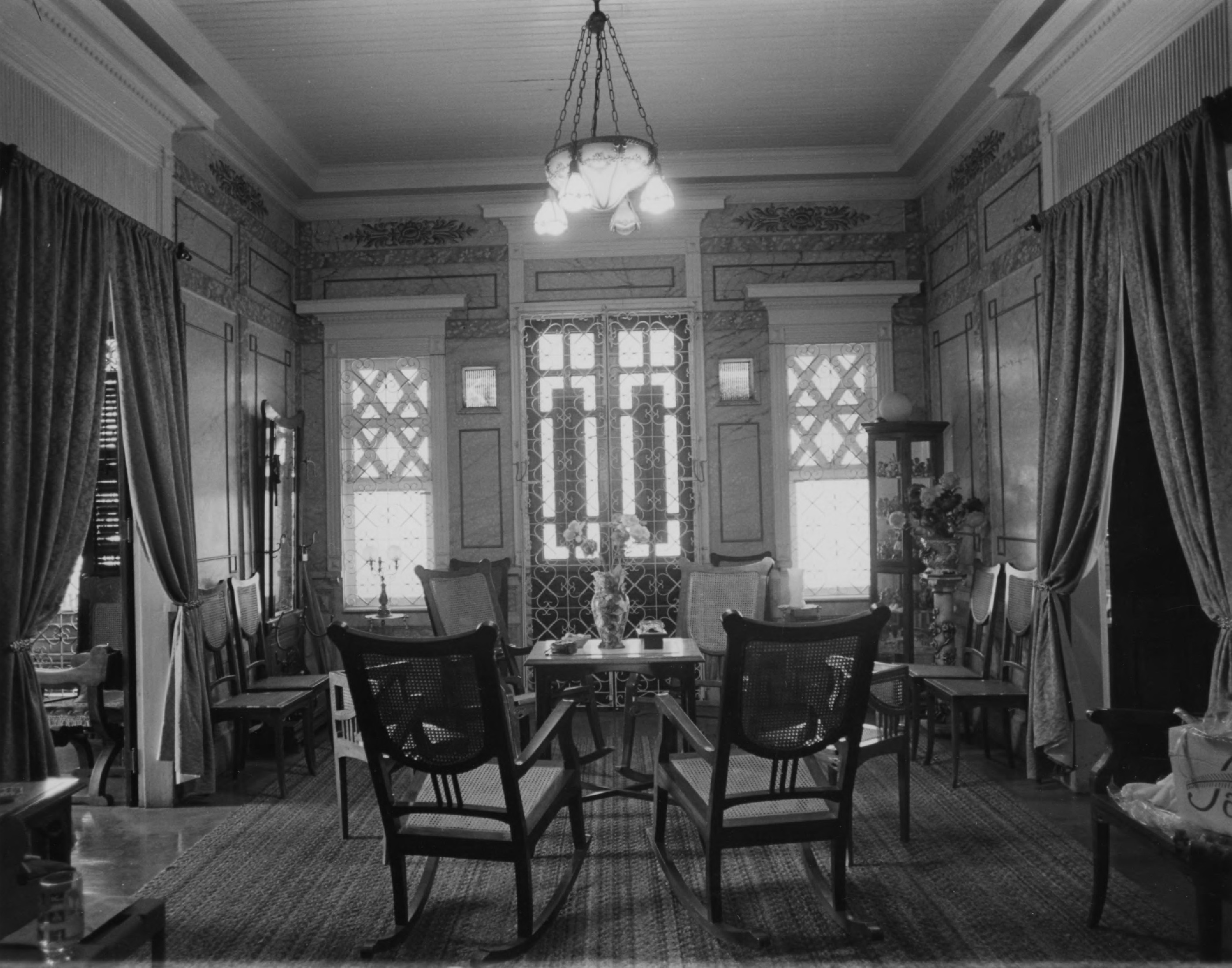

== See also ==
- Architecture of Puerto Rico
- National Register of Historic Places listings in southern Puerto Rico
