= Antiguo Hospital Militar Español de Ponce =

Historic building in Ponce, Puerto Rico

- U.S. National Register of Historic Places
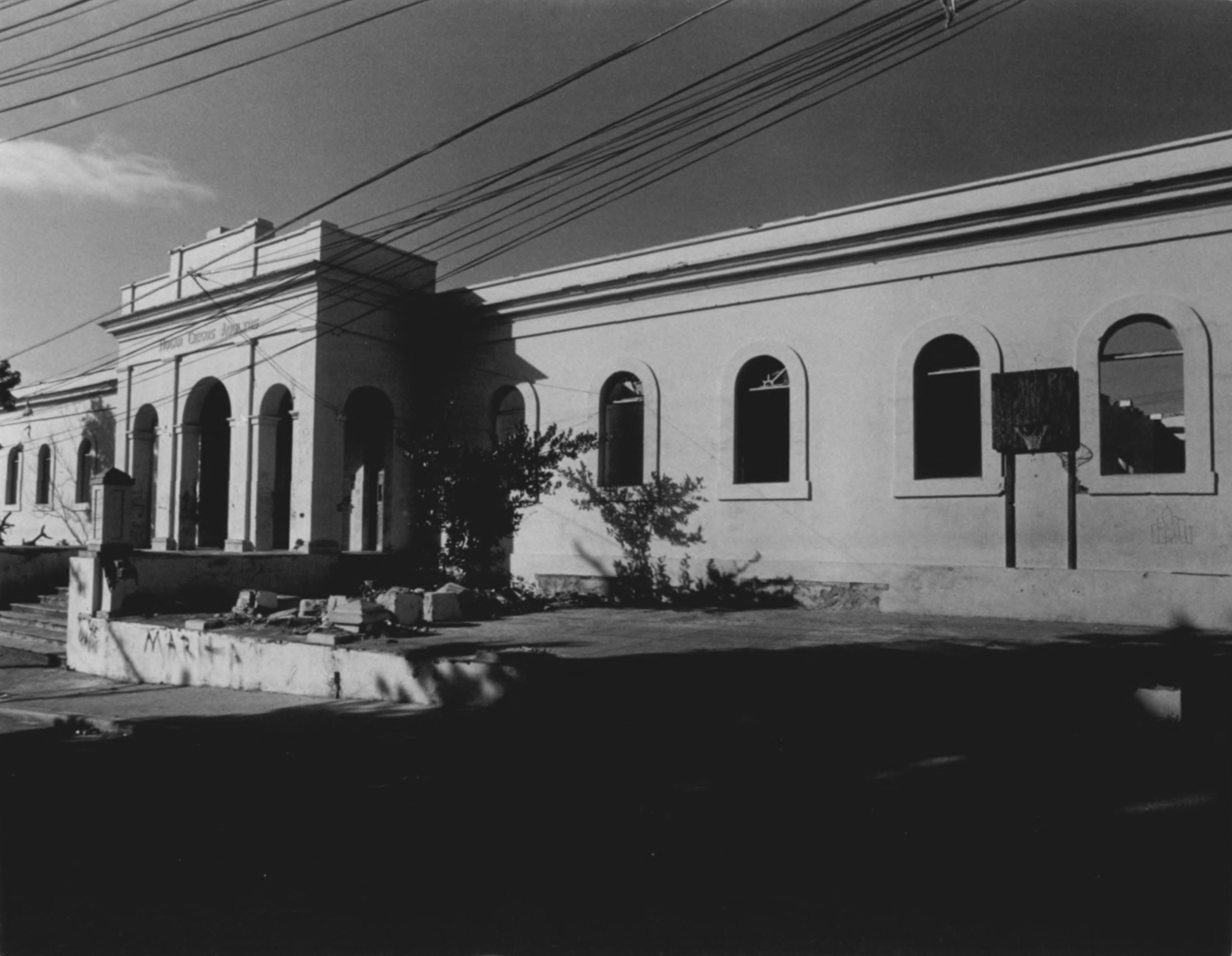

- Location within Puerto Rico
- Location: Calle Bondad, between Calle Atocha and Calle León; Ponce, Puerto Rico
- Coordinates: 18°01′08″N 66°36′52″W
- Area: 1 acre (4,000 m^{2})
- Built: 1896-97
- Architect: Spanish Royal Corps of Engineers
- Architectural style: Neoclassical architecture
- MPS: 19th Century Civil Architecture in Ponce TR
- NRHP reference No.: 87000770

The Antiguo Hospital Militar Español de Ponce (English: Old Spanish Military Hospital in Ponce) is a historic building in Ponce, Puerto Rico, in the city's historic district. The building dates from 1896 or 1897. It was designed by the Spanish Royal Corps of Engineers. The architecture consists of 19th Neoclassical architecture style. The building is of architectural significance since it is the only one-story building of this style remaining in the city of Ponce and one of the best examples on the Island. Completed in 1897, the year before the Spanish–American War of 1898, this building was the last major construction undergone by the Spanish Government in the Americas. From 1905 to the mid 1970s the structure served as the Asilo de Ciegos de Ponce (Ponce Blind Asylum). As of 2020 the building sits abandoned.

== History ==
The structure commonly known as the Asilo de Ciegos (Home of the Blind) was built between 1896 and 1897 to serve as hospital for the city of Ponce's military garrison. The Royal Spanish Engineering Corps constructed this building in the then popular neoclassic style which was common to the old San Juan area, but was not at the time prevalent in Ponce. This building, together with El Castillo (Ponce's Spanish military headquarters), Hospital Tricoche (Ponce's Municipal Hospital), and the Casa Alcaldía are the only remaining buildings representative of the Spanish Crown's interest in other areas of the Island besides San Juan.

On 1 October 1905, the structure was re-inaugurated as Asilo de Ciegos de Ponce (Ponce Blind Asylum) to serve as the home for the blind adults in the city. It operated as a home for the blind until the mid 1970s, when it was closed. It had room to house 95 residents and, in the early 1910s, had a regular occupancy of 80. As a home for the blind it sought provide medical assistance to its residents, including ophthalmic surgery. Dr. Guillermo Vives performed numerous successful surgeries on its residents, restoring eyesight to approximately 95% of its patients. The institution sought to teach the blind skills to become independent citizens, and permanent housing was provided to those who could not care for themselves.

== Significance ==
The building is of architectural significance since it is the only one-story building of this style remaining in the city of Ponce and one of the best examples in the Island.

The hospital served the military community stationed in Ponce and in the southern region and could be used by the civilian population in case of emergencies and natural disasters, thus solving a social need in the southern part of the Island.

In 1905, this property was given to the state government to be used as an asylum for the blind. It gave shelter to the many poor blind in the south. Here they were taught skills that could help them support themselves in the future. In other instances those who could not be rehabilitated were given a home and free meals thus keeping them from the streets where they could be in danger. The social functions carried out in this building continued until the mid-1970s when the structure was closed. The people of Ponce consider this structure to be important to the community's history for its role as hospital and asylum.

== Physical appearance and description ==
This one story building is a very good example of Neoclassic style in Ponce and the only one single-story building in the area. It preserves its simple lines typical of the 19th century institutional or military construction in the Island. Contributing elements to the style are its massive and sober exterior elements consisting of wide walls and pilasters crowned with tuscan order capitols, planar window surrounds, and a set of steps giving access to the main portico which projects form the main facade. A simple cornice crowns the building in all facades. Series of arched windows originally closed by wood louvers and glass panel transomes, complete the facade (these windows were replaced with metal blinds in the mid-1960s and have been vandalized in recent years).

The main entrance is highlighted by a projecting portico of attractive proportions. It has a main central arch flanked by smaller ones to the sides. These arches and the other two lateral ones are ornamented with tuscan order pilasters. Four tuscan order pilasters, a simple frieze, cornice, and parapet complete the portico's decoration giving it the appearance of being slightly taller than the rest of the building.

The structure was erected around a rectangular central patio with arched galleries on all sides that serve as transitional elements to the office and room areas located throughout its periphery, all of which are typical of the period and style. A small fountain in the center of the patio served the dual purposes of ornamentation and water supply. This element no longer exists. The building was constructed of brick and a mixture of rubblework and stone. A series of symmetrically-placed thick walls carrying wooden beams, probably of ausubo or other Puerto Rican hard wood, support the brick roof. This structure has a basement, an uncommon element in this type of construction, on its south side.

Many of the windows and parts of the roof as well as many wooden parts have been vandalized in recent years since the structure has not been in use. However, the main structural and ornamental elements of the building are in good shape or could be restored. The structure is not currently in use nor accessible to the public.

== See also ==
- National Register of Historic Places in Ponce, Puerto Rico
