= Yauco barrio-pueblo =

Historical and administrative center (seat) of Yauco, Puerto Rico

Yauco barrio-pueblo Pueblo de Yauco
- Municipality Seat
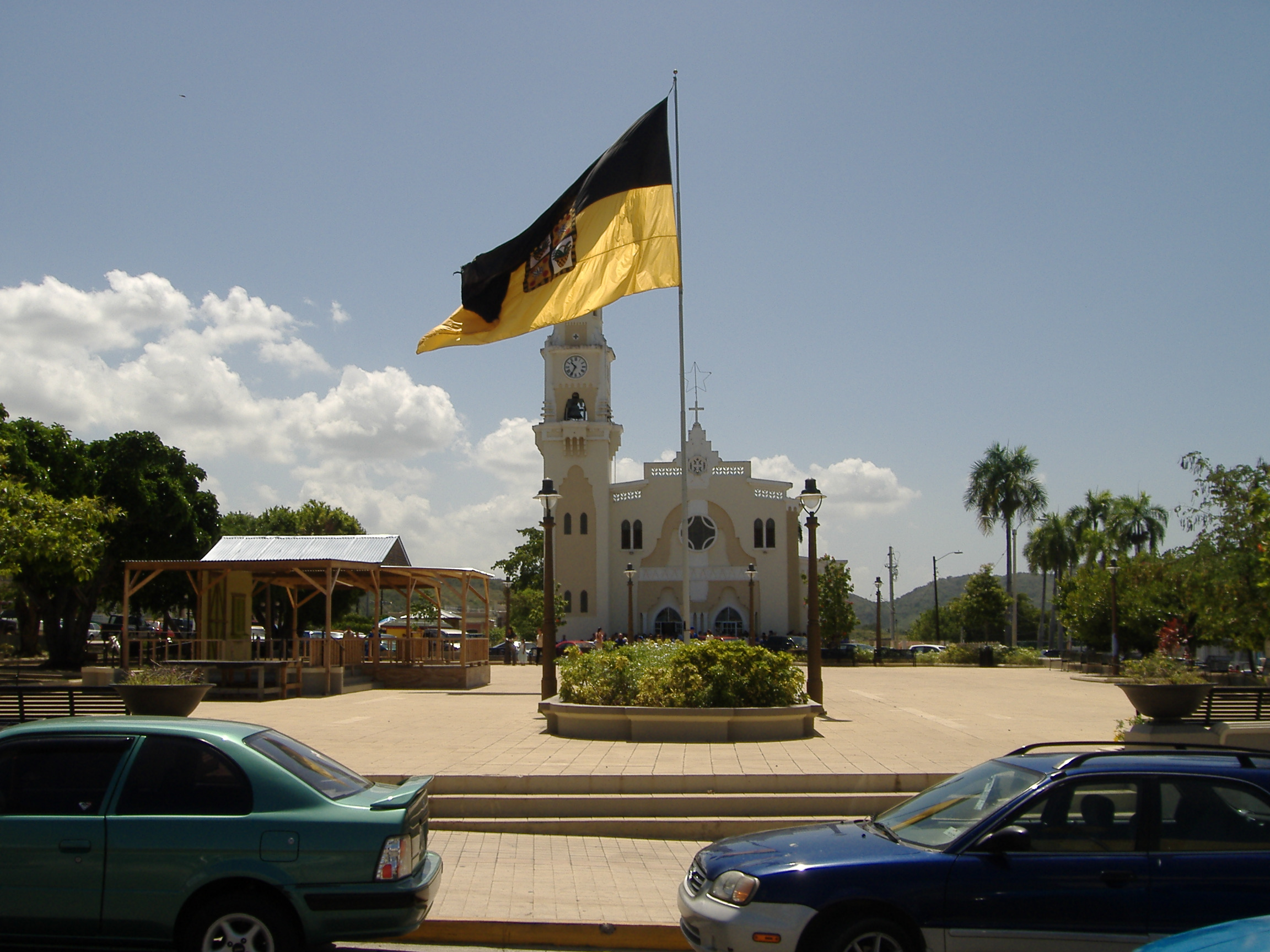
- A plaza in Yauco barrio-pueblo

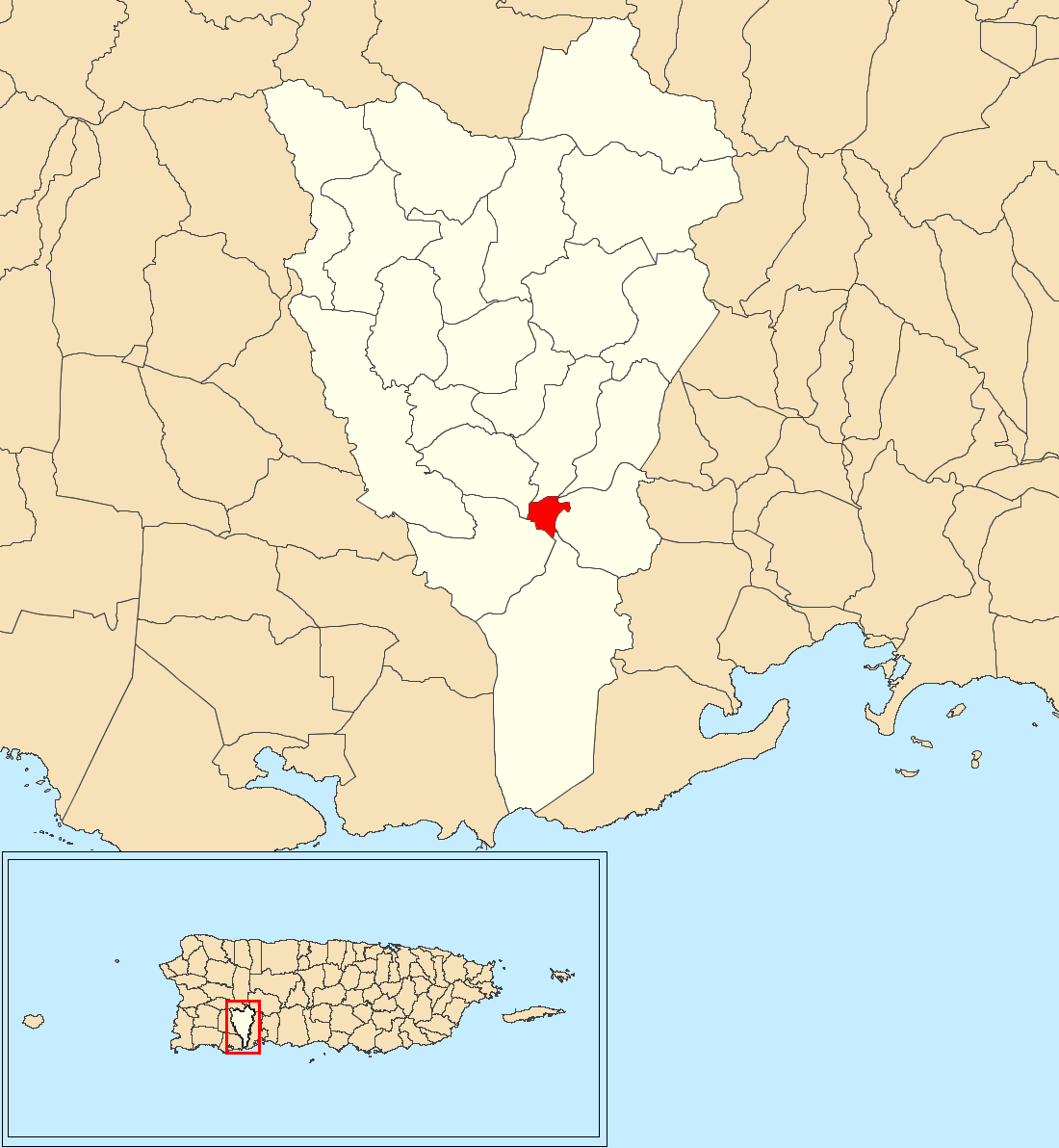
- Location of Yauco barrio-pueblo within the municipality of Yauco shown in red

- Location of Puerto Rico
- Coordinates: 18°02′11″N 66°50′58″W
- Commonwealth: Puerto Rico
- Municipality: Yauco

Area
  - Total: 0.32 sq mi (0.83 km^{2})
  - Land: 0.32 sq mi (0.83 km^{2})
  - Water: 0 sq mi (0 km^{2})
- Elevation: 167 ft (51 m)

Population (2010)
  - Total: 3,091
  - Density: 9,659.4/sq mi (3,729.5/km^{2})
- Source: 2010 Census
- Time zone: UTC−4 (AST)
- ZIP Code: 00698
- Area code: 787/939

Yauco barrio-pueblo is a barrio and the administrative center (seat) of Yauco, a municipality of Puerto Rico. Its population in 2010 was 3,091.

As was customary in Spain, in Puerto Rico, the municipality has a barrio called pueblo which contains a central plaza, the municipal buildings (city hall), and a Catholic church. Fiestas patronales (patron saint festivals) are held in the central plaza every year.

== The central plaza and its church ==
The central plaza, or square, is a place for official and unofficial recreational events and a place where people can gather and socialize from dusk to dawn. The Laws of the Indies, Spanish law, which regulated life in Puerto Rico in the early 19th century, stated the plaza's purpose was for "the parties" (celebrations, festivities) (Spanish: a propósito para las fiestas), and that the square should be proportionally large enough for the number of neighbors (Spanish: grandeza proporcionada al número de vecinos). These Spanish regulations also stated that the streets nearby should be comfortable portals for passersby, protecting them from the elements: sun and rain.

Located across the central plaza in Yauco barrio-pueblo is the Parroquia Santísimo Rosario, a Roman Catholic church which was inaugurated in 1934. There have been two other churches there; the first pueblo church which was made from wood was constructed in 1754 and frequented by patrons until 1848. Then in 1849 another church was built. It was demolished in 1930 making room for the church that stands there now.

== History ==
Yauco barrio-pueblo was in Spain's gazetteers until Puerto Rico was ceded by Spain in the aftermath of the Spanish–American War under the terms of the Treaty of Paris of 1898 and became an unincorporated territory of the United States. In 1899, the United States Department of War conducted a census of Puerto Rico finding that the population of Pueblo barrio was 6,108.

Historical population
Census	Pop.	Note	%±
1900	6,108		—
1910	6,589		7.9%
1920	7,053		7.0%
1930	8,607		22.0%
1940	9,985		16.0%
1950	9,801		−1.8%
1960	8,996		−8.2%
1970	0		−100.0%
1980	5,157		—
1990	4,610		−10.6%
2000	4,258		−7.6%
2010	3,091		−27.4%
U.S. Decennial Census; 1899 (shown as 1900) 1910-1930; 1930-1950 1980-2000 2010

== Gallery ==
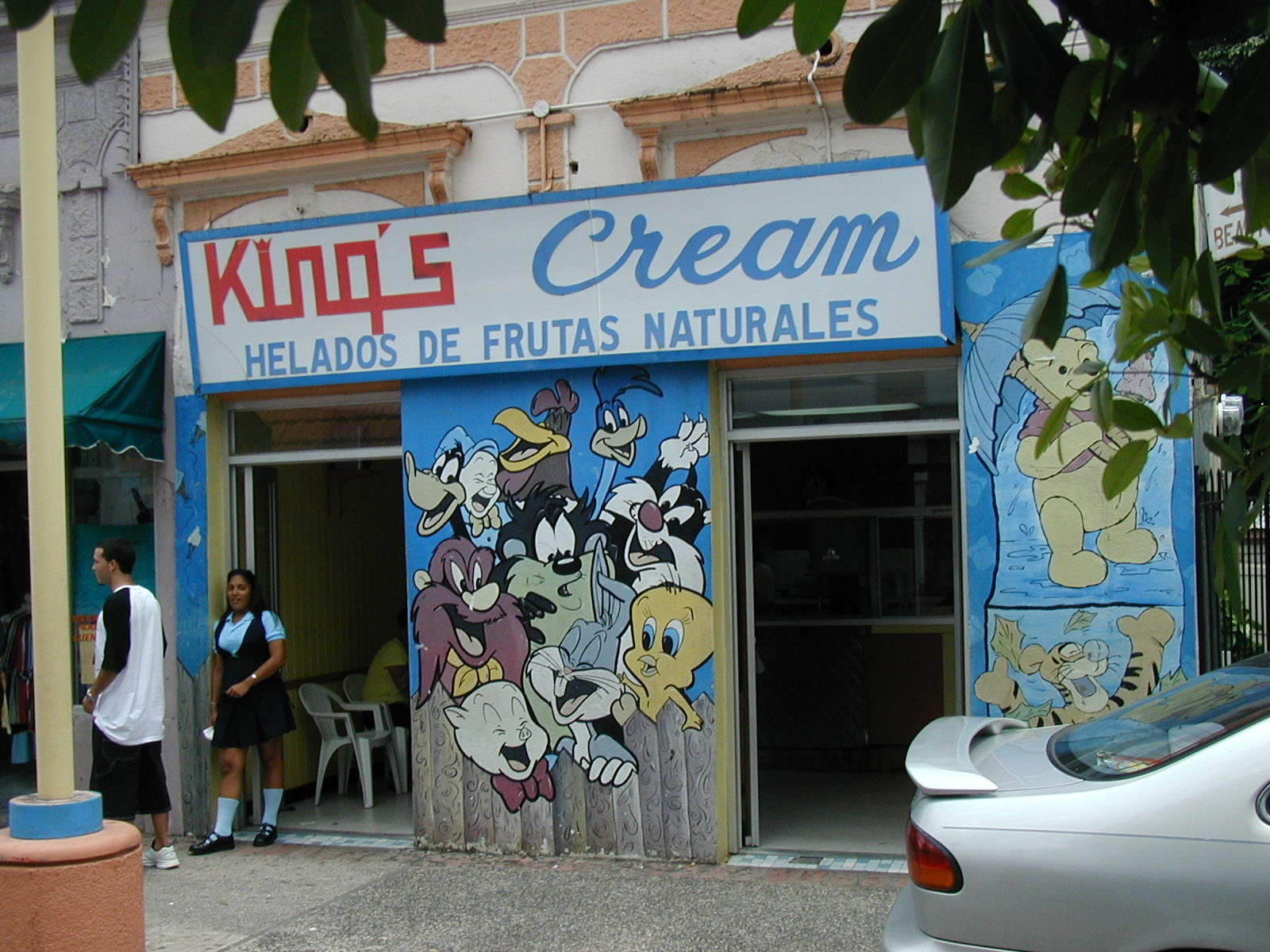
Ice Cream shop in barrio-pueblo

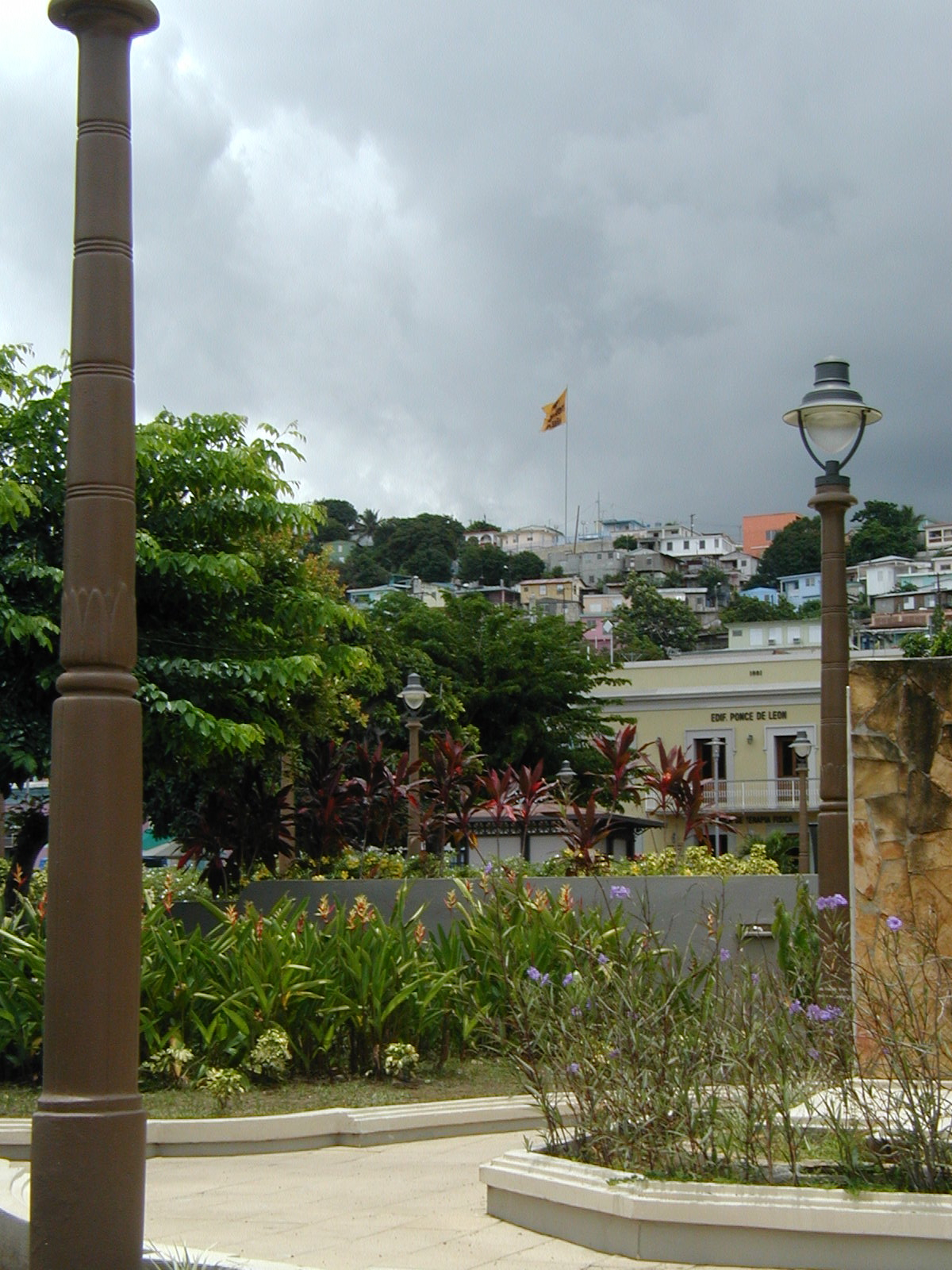
Central plaza

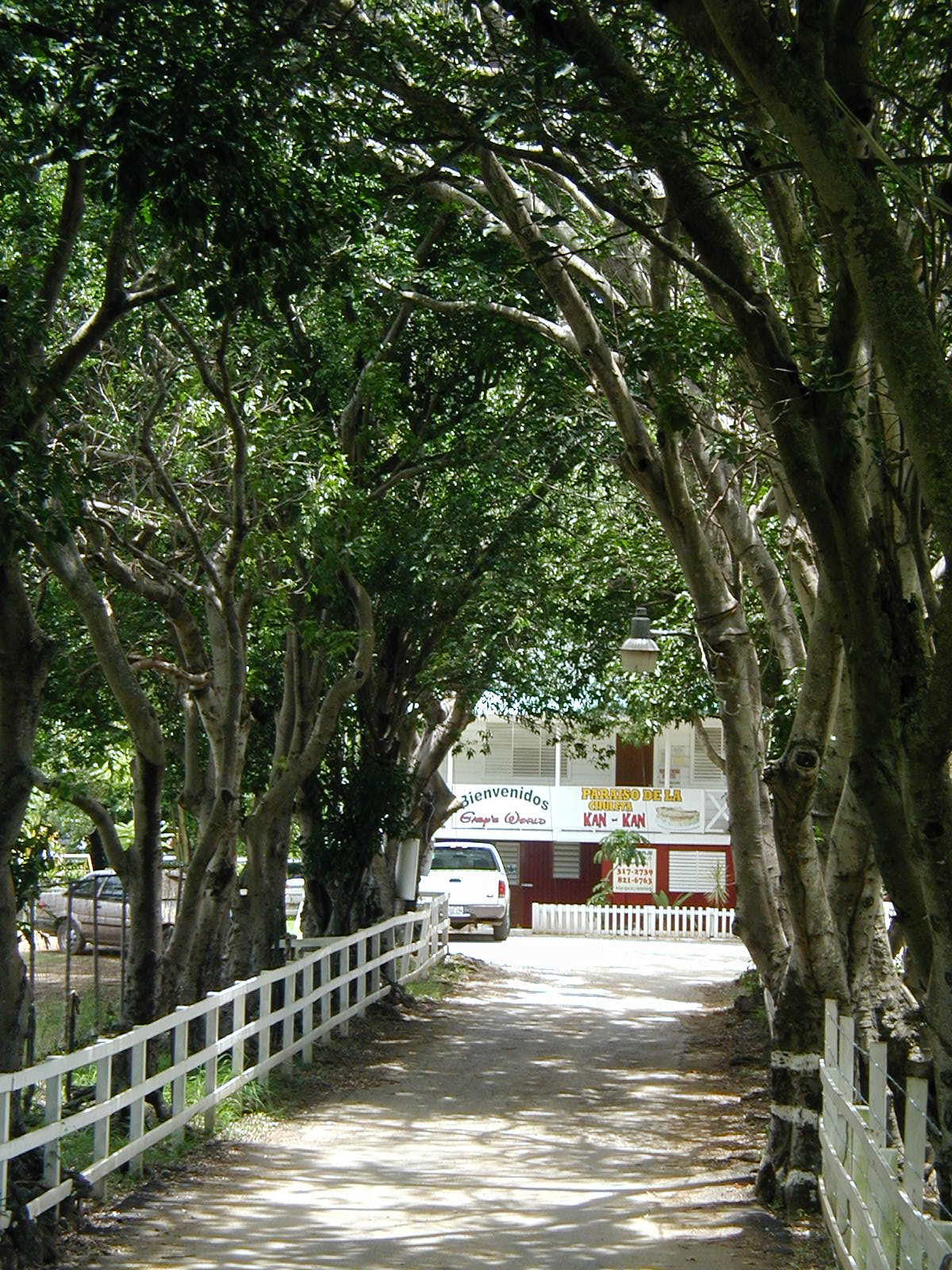
Gaby's restaurant

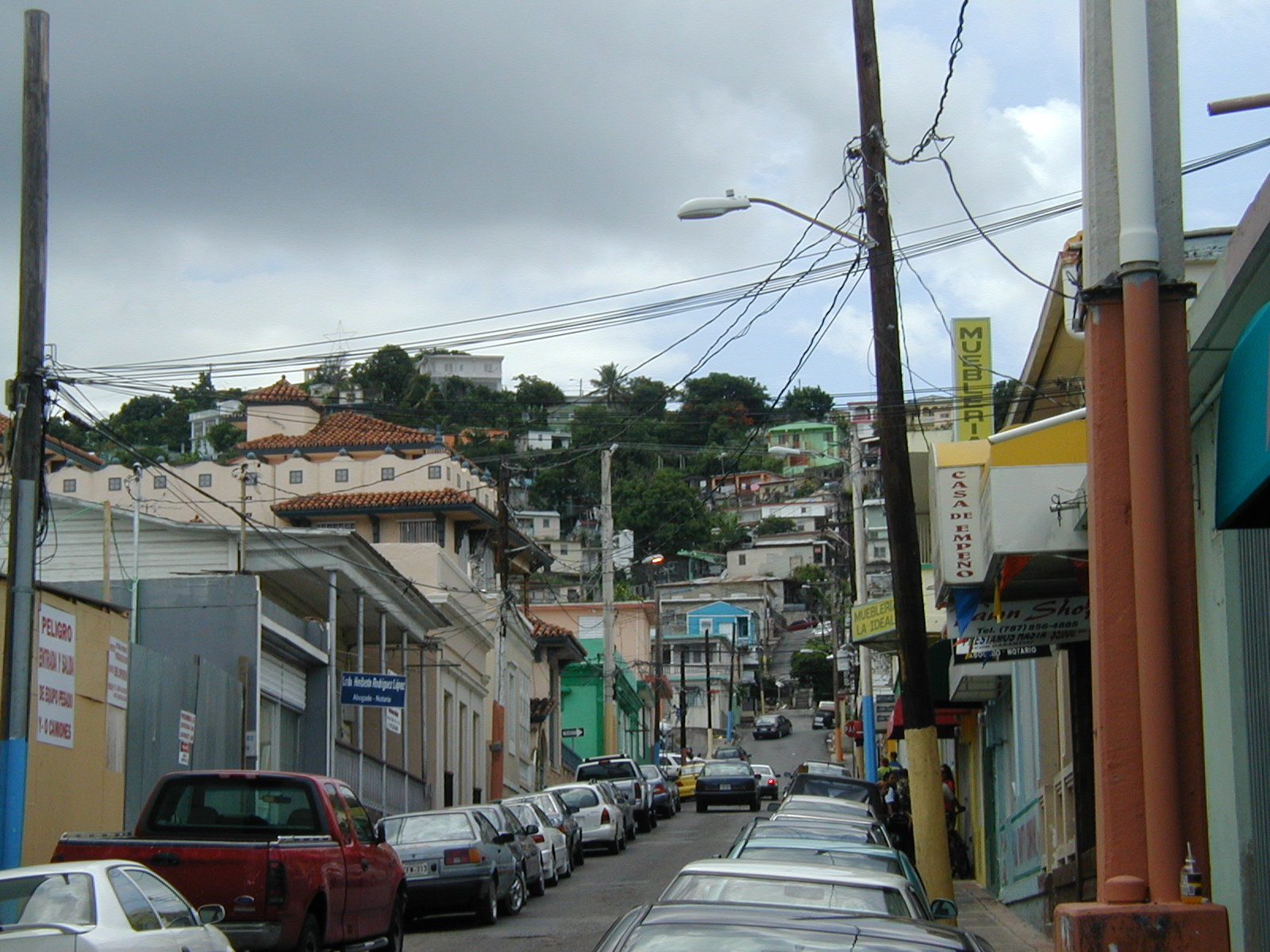
Street in barrio-pueblo

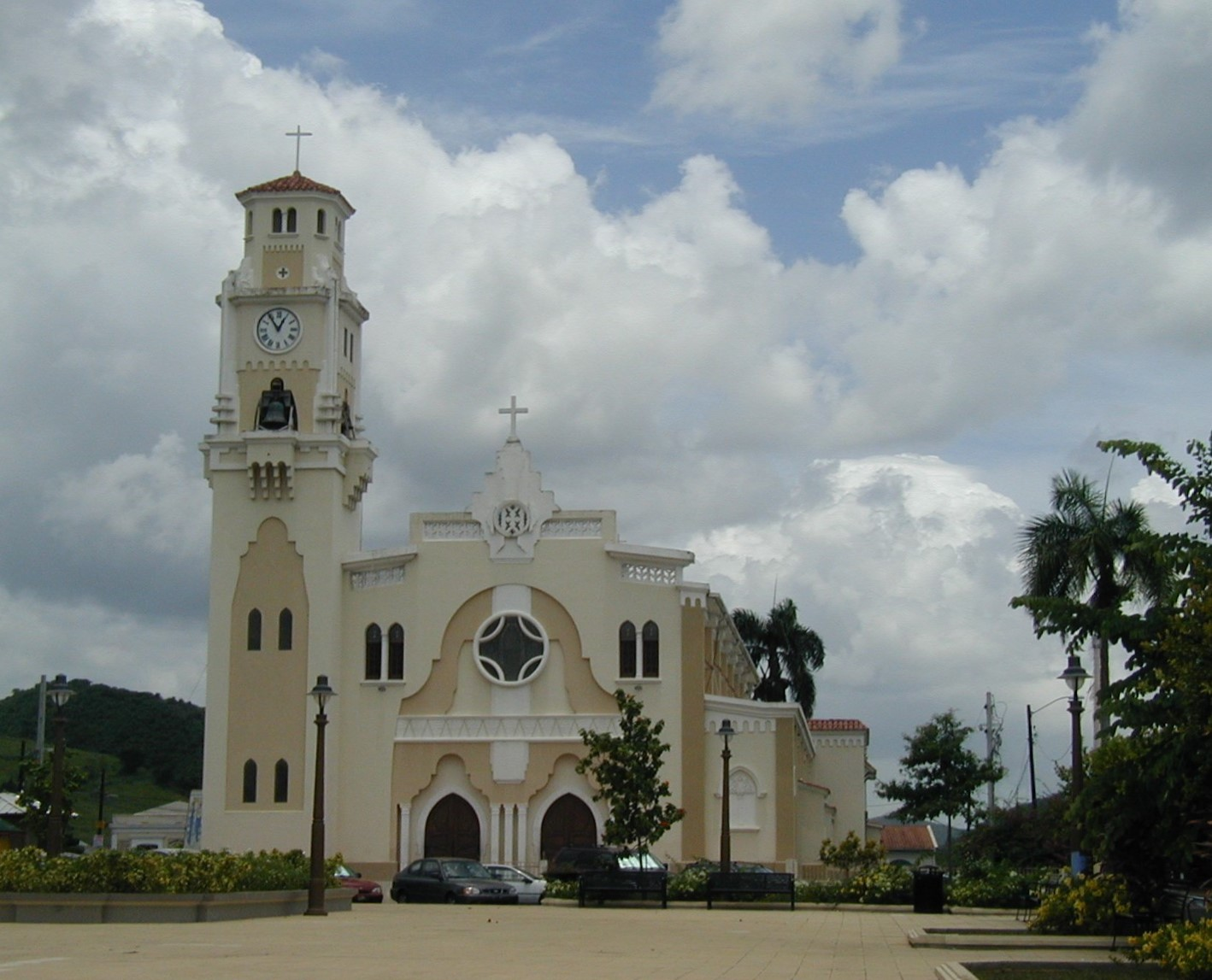
Catholic church

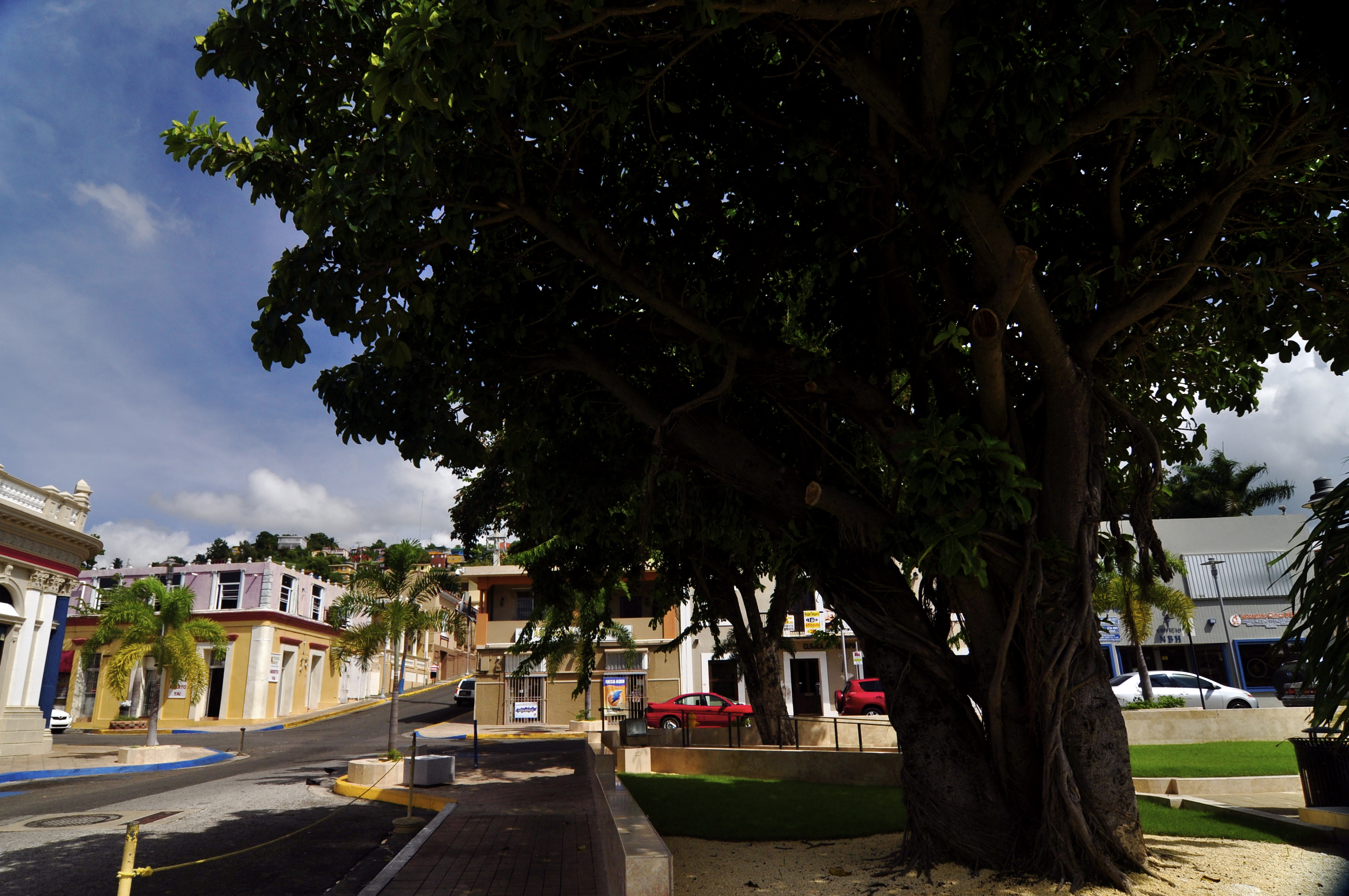
Tree in barrio-pueblo

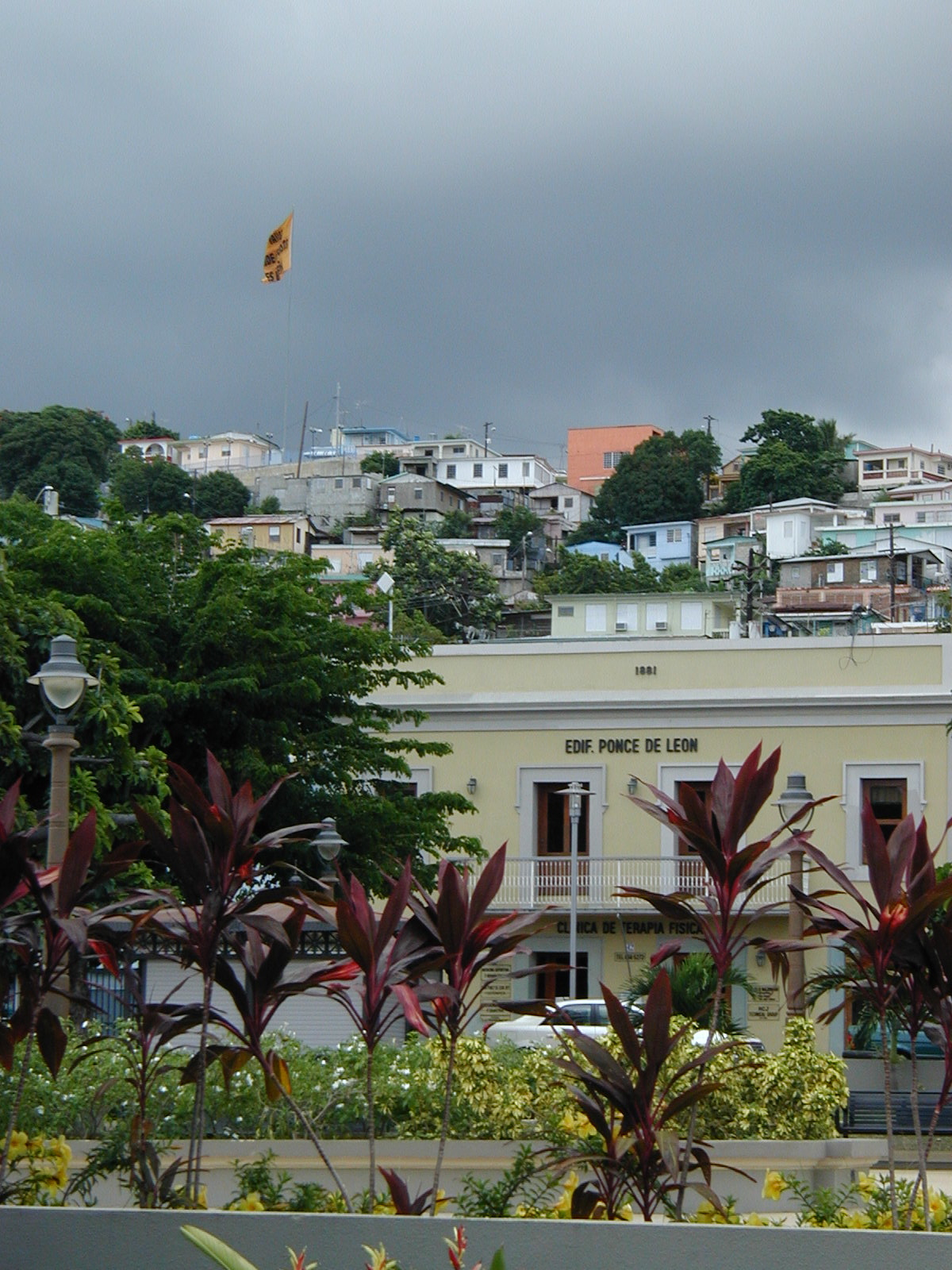
Houses on a hillside, view from barrio-pueblo

== See also ==
- List of communities in Puerto Rico
