= Ponce Creole =

Architectural style created in Ponce, Puerto Rico

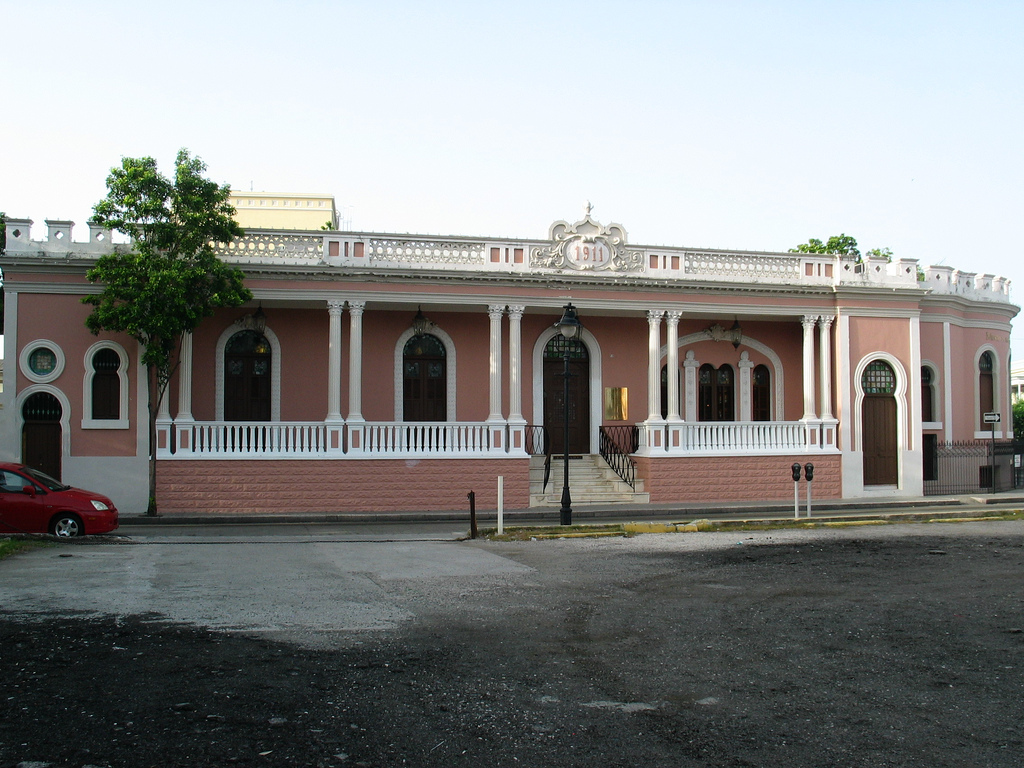
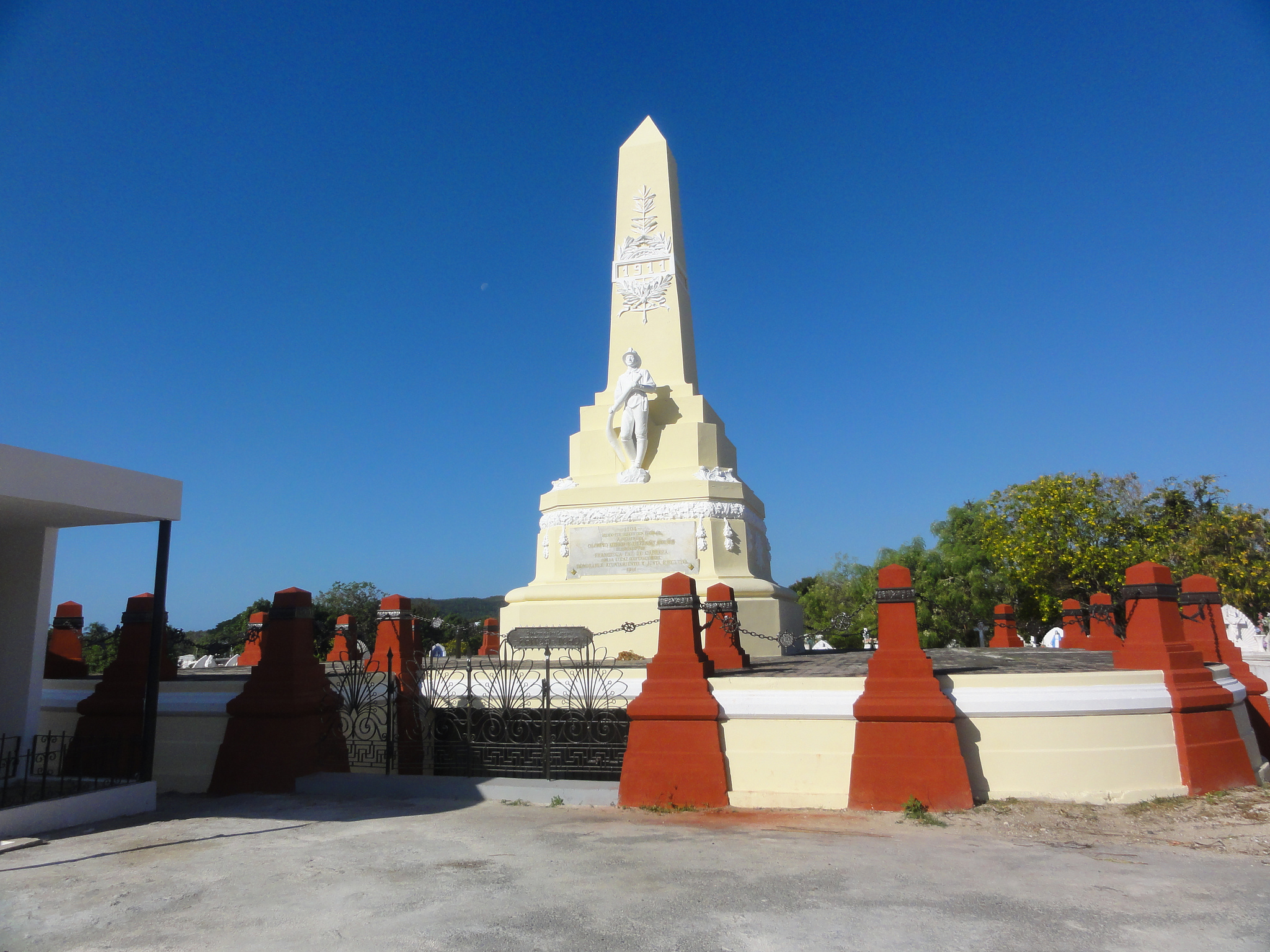
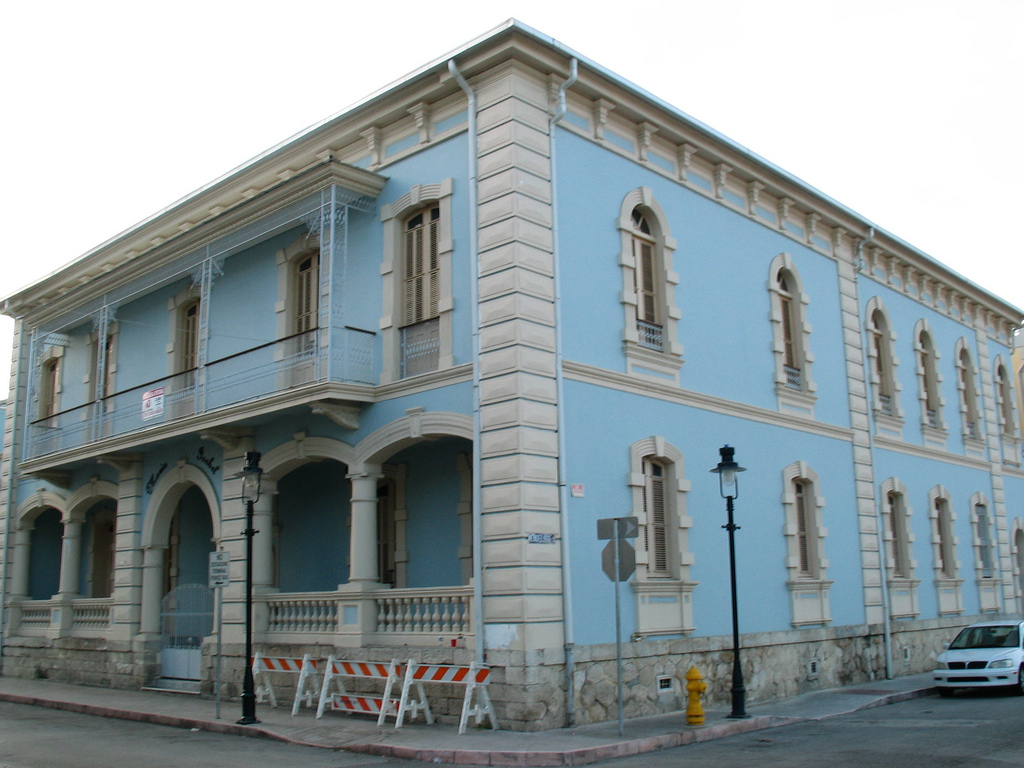
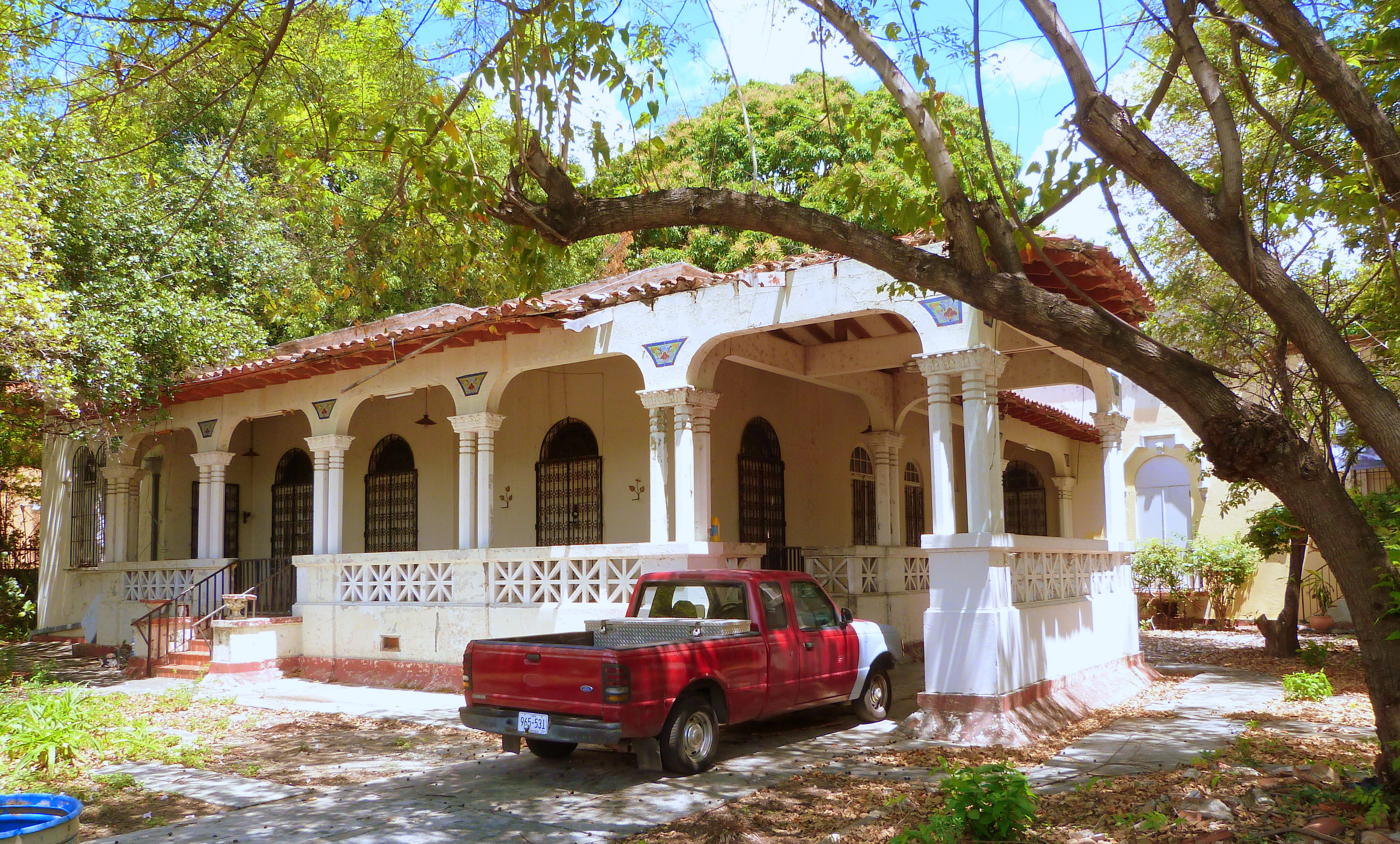
- Left to right, top to bottom: Casa Salazar-Candal (1911) by Blas Silva, Mausoleum to the 'El Polvorin' Fire Heroes (1911) by Alfredo B. Wiechers, Casa Rosaly–Batiz (1897) by Manuel Domenech, Casa Fernando Luis Toro (1927) by Francisco Porrata Doria
- Years active: 1890-1930
- Location: Ponce (Puerto Rico)
- Major figures: Blas Silva, Manuel V. Domenech, Francisco Porrata Doria, Alfredo B. Wiechers
- Influences: Classical revival, Spanish Revival, Victorian

Ponce Creole is an architectural style created in Ponce, Puerto Rico, in the late 19th and early 20th century. This style of Puerto Rican buildings is found predominantly in residential homes in Ponce built between 1895 and 1920. Ponce Creole architecture borrows heavily from French, Spanish, and Caribbean vernacular styles to create structures able to withstand the region's hot and dry climate, while taking advantage of the sun and sea breezes characteristic of the southern Puerto Rican coast. It usually employs a blend of wood and masonry, incorporating architectural elements of other styles, from Spanish Revival to Victorian.

== Definition ==
Ponce Creole is the name given to the architectural style that is unique to Ponce: "San Juan, the capital, was planned and built by the Spanish conquerors, one writer points out, while Ponce is the work of its native sons, making it a truly authentic Puerto Rican city."

== Location ==
The central district of Ponce in particular is a blend of Ponce Creole and Art Deco: "The Historic District of Ponce: Second only to Old San Juan in terms of historical significance, the central district of Ponce is a blend of Ponce Creole and Art Deco building styles, dating mainly from the 1890s to the 1930s. One street, Calle Isabel, offers an array of Ponceño architectural styles, which often incorporate neoclassical details. The city underwent a massive restoration preceding the celebration of its 300th anniversary in 1996."

== Origins ==
Architectural structures of the Ponce Creole style are amongst the 1,046 buildings being restored in Ponce: "The commonwealth has allocated $440 million to restore a 66-block downtown area of 1,046 buildings ranging in style from old Spanish colonial to neoclassical, from "Ponce Créole" to Art Deco. Many of Ponce's central buildings were erected between the late 1890s and the 1930s, when the city was the hub of the island's rum, sugar cane and shipping industries and was known as La Perla del Sur, the 'Pearl of the South.' It was home to many artists, politicians, and poets." Today, three styles dominate the architectural landscape in Ponce: Neoclassical, Ponce Creole, and Art Deco.

== Characteristics ==
External videos
- You may see some of Ponce Creole architecture HERE

The Ponce Creole style is characterized by wood and stucco buildings with broad columned porches and balconies and painted in the pinks, peaches, and limes common to hot countries. The style is a blend of Spanish Creole and neoclassical architecture: "In the late 19th century, Ponce developed its own blend of Spanish Creole and neoclassical architecture called Ponce Creole; it's characterized by the use of Corinthian columns, wrought-iron balconies, and gas lamps. It was dubbed Creole because it reminded some of New Orleans's French Quarter. Wealth from Ponce's sugarcane industry financed most of the elegantly ornamented buildings." Some of the other prominent characteristics of this architectural style have been described by Pablo Ojeda O'Neill as "a long raised porch, stone rostrium-raised homes to achieve ventilation and to protect the wood foundation, a series of front doors with wooden windows to maximize ventilation."

In their classic study about Ponce architecture, Reed and Torres identified the Ponce Creole style as "a one-storeyed residential masonry dwelling with front lintel doors and side gate, garage with interior ceiling arches, interior walls with wall guards, porch and garage ironwork in wrought-iron, multiple front double doors with four sets of wooden blinds each, porch with simple wooden columns with crowns in the classical tradition, simple door frames, and porch roof of wood and zinc."

== Notable architects ==
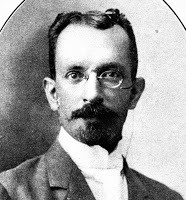
Blas Silva, the most prominent of Ponce Creole architects

While Ponce had many prominent architects during this period, such as Manuel V. Domenech, Francisco Porrata-Doría, and Alfredo B. Wiechers, it was Blas Silva who distinguished himself in that he actually created a whole new architectural style.

Adapting the curves of the Art Nouveau to the persistent Neo-classicism of Puerto Rico, Silva succeeded in creating a movement in architecture which broke away from the traditional forms while remaining within them. The traditional continuous raised verandah along the front facade is broken up into two and twisted out of its usual linearity into the curved forms preserved today. Characteristic of the architecture to abound in Ponce contemporaneous to Castillo 34, for example, is a profusion of applique, and eclectic combination and juxtaposition of shapes, particularly curvilinear, and a general ostentation of articulation. The structure at 34 Castillo Street is listed in the National Register of Historic Places.

Blas Silva was probably the most established of the "wedding-cake architects" and was thus sought after mostly by the "nouveau riche" of the period. Silva's houses are among the richest in Ponce, among which the Font-Ubides House (a.k.a. Monsanto Residence) stands out for its circular porches. Other buildings by Blas Silva include the Frau Residence and the Salazar-Candal Residence, both also listed in the NRHP.

In addition to Blas Silva, at least ten other architects designed in the Ponce Creole style: Herminio Valls, Francisco Valls, Eduardo Salichs, Alfredo Wiechers, Adolfo Nones, Francisco Grevi, (Note: Francisco Grevi was a master builder who implemented Ponce Creole concepts in his buildings. (See, Socorro Giron. "Ponce, el teatro La Perla y La Campana de la Almudaina." 1992. Page 466.)) Marcos Ramos, (Note: Marcos Ramos was a master builder who implemented Ponce Creole concepts in his constructions. (See, Socorro Giron. "Ponce, el teatro La Perla y La Campana de la Almudaina." 1992. Page 466.)) Elias Concepcion, and Miguel Porrata-Doria and Antonio Geigel. (Note: Antonio Geigel was an engineer but implemented Ponce Creole concepts in his designs. (See, Socorro Giron. "Ponce, el teatro La Perla y La Campana de la Almudaina." 1992. Page 466.))

== Examples ==
=== Castillo 34 ===
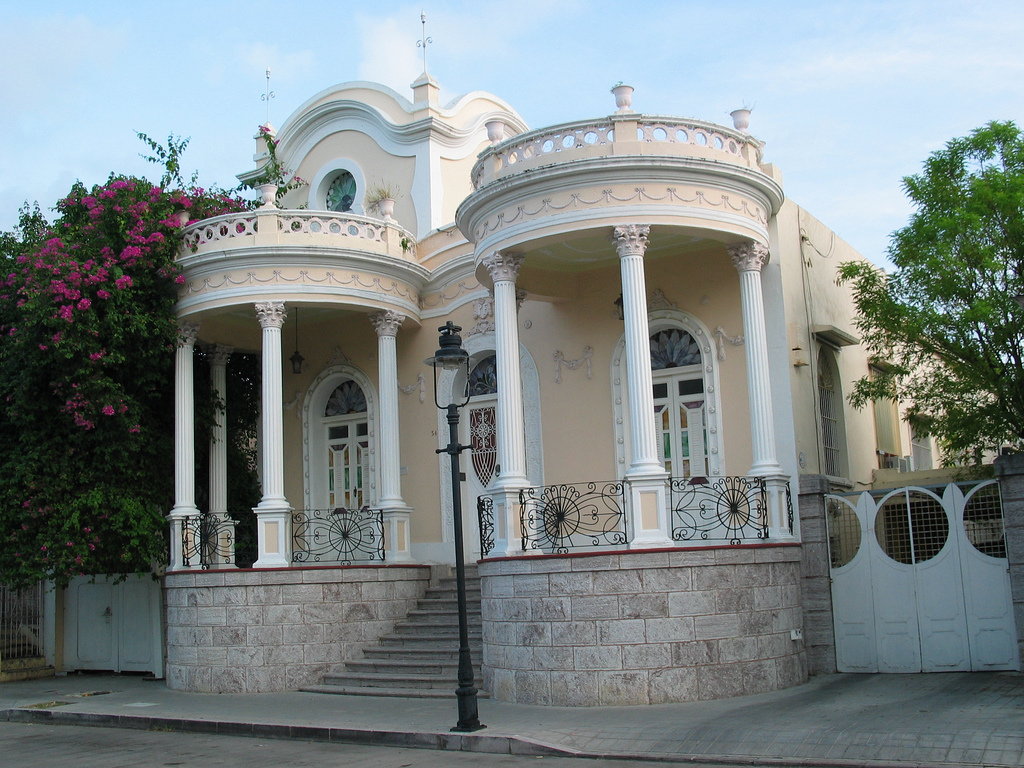
The Font-Ubides Residence (by Blas Silva) at Castillo 34, with its unique curvilinear forms and ornament

One example of the Ponce Creole style can be appreciated is Blas’ 1913 design of the Font-Ubides House at Calle Castillo number 34. This residence stands out among the great houses of Ponce for its aggressive incorporation of curvilinear forms and ornament. The house incorporates elements of Neoclassical and Art Nouveau architectural styles. The traditional continuous raised veranda along the front facade is broken up into two and twisted out of its usual linearity into the curved forms preserved today. Characteristic of the architecture to abound in Ponce contemporaneous to Castillo 34, is a profusion of aplique, and eclectic combination and juxtaposition of shapes, particularly curvilinear, and a general ostentation of articulation.

=== Cristina 70 ===
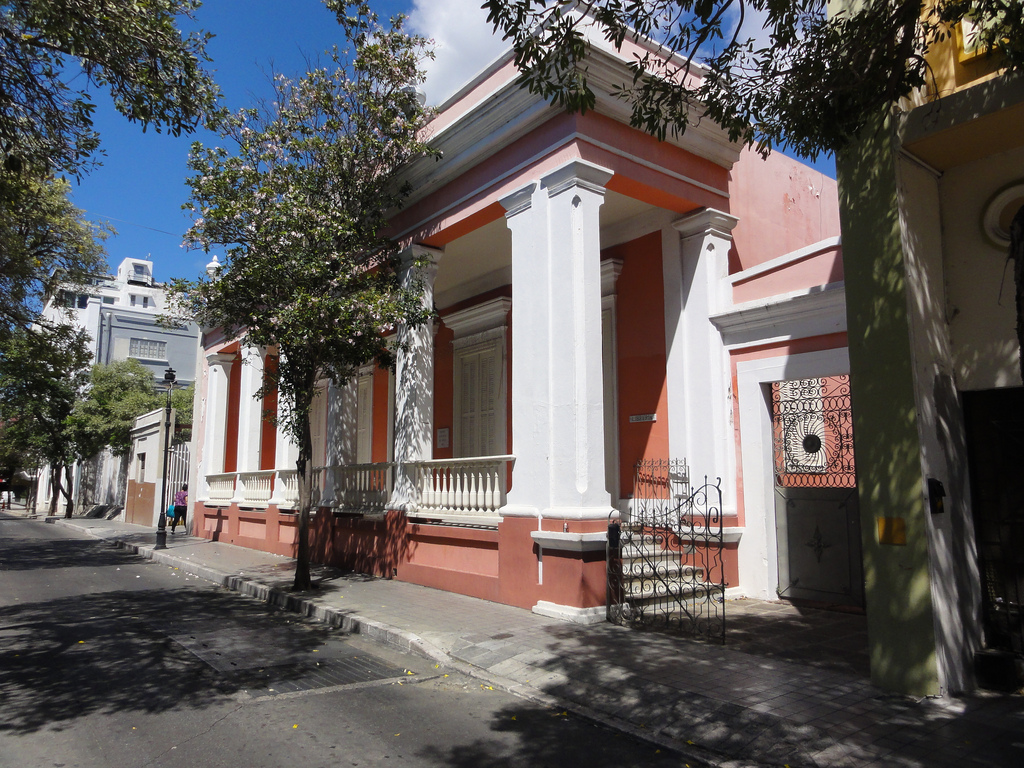
The Ermelindo Salazar Residence (by Juan Bertoli Calderoni) at Calle Cristina 70

Calle Cristina number 70, commissioned by Ermelindo Salazar and subsequently home to the Museum of Puerto Rican Music, is another example of Ponce Creole architecture. The structure was designed by Juan Bertoli Calderoni. Today, Cristina 70 houses a museum and gallery depicting the various influences on Puerto Rican art, while also serving as the headquarters of the Centro Cultural de Ponce Carmen Solá de Pereira, the cultural center of the city of Ponce, where it is also used for educational and cultural activities. The structure incorporates elements of Colonial Spanish and Ponce Creole architecture. Its courtyard is surrounded by a gallery. In 1990, the Instituto de Cultura Puertorriqueña restored the structure to house the first headquarters of the Museo de la Música Puertorriqueña.

=== Reina 107 ===
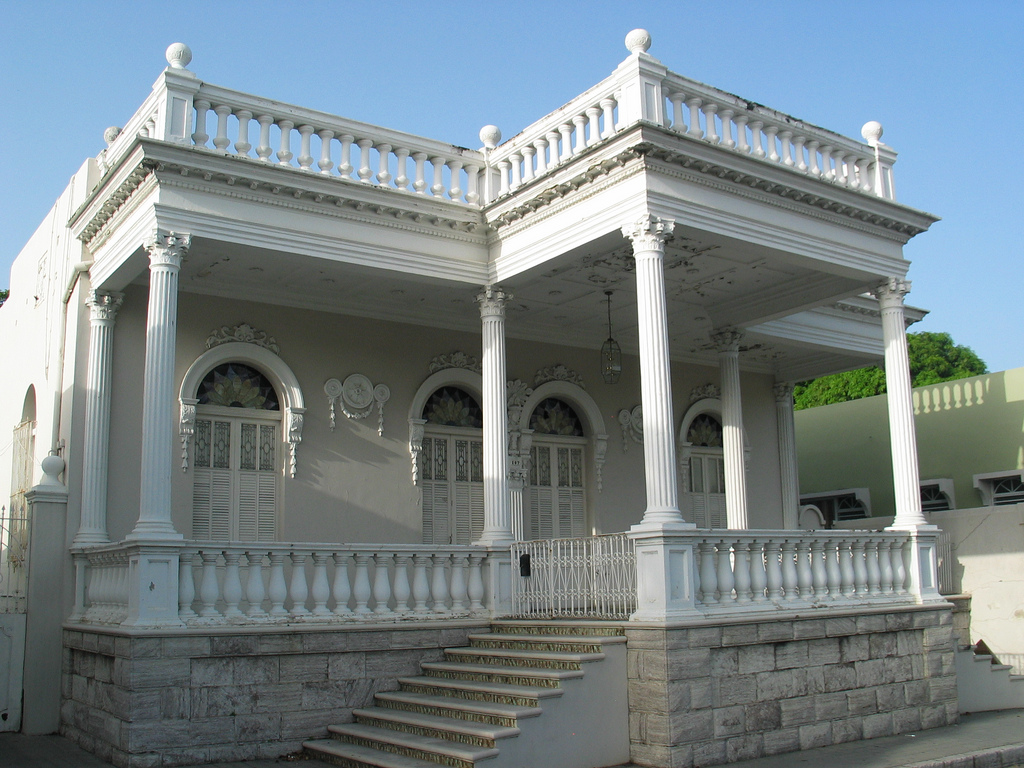
The Frau Residence, aka, Residencia Subirá (by Blas Silva) at Reina 107

The Frau Residence at Calle Reina number 107 is an example of the architecture of Ponce's aristocracy of the late 19th and early 20th centuries. "This structure is one of the remaining symbols of Ponce's "Golden Period" in which land-owning families lived in the urban core and great immigrations from Europe, Latin America and the other Antilles had turned the originally small settlement into the cultural capital of Puerto Rico. The "Criollo Ponceno" or Ponce Creole architecture to which this building belongs is extremely important in itself since it represents the birth of a high-style native architecture, a hybrid of influences rather than the purely Spanish, or spontaneous vernacular expressions of previous centuries. In particular, the Frau Residence is significant within this genre as it was designed by one of Ponce's most well-known architects, Blas Silva. Silva was particularly well known among the wealthy classes of the period. His buildings can usually be characterized by what is popularly referred to as wedding-cake architecture of the landed nouyeau riche, for the richness of ornament and detail. Other buildings by Silva include the Monsanto Residence and the Salazar-Candal Residence, both listed in the NRHP."

=== Isabel 53 ===
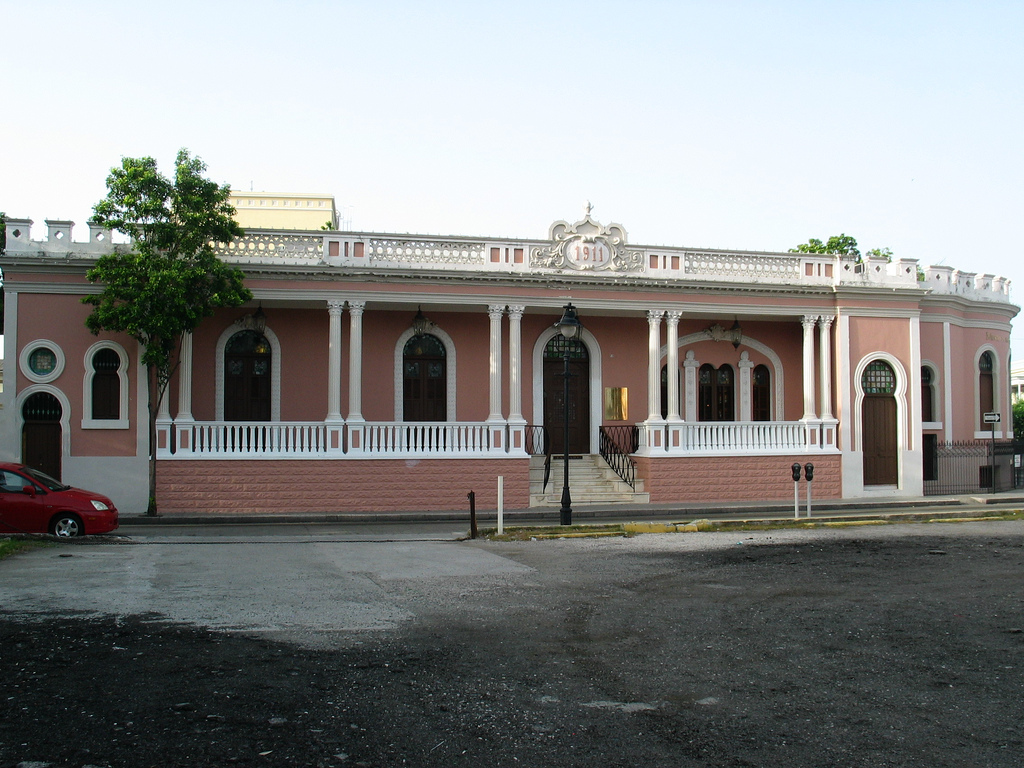
The Salazar-Candal Residence (by Blas Silva) at Calle Isabel 53

The Salazar-Candal Residence located at Calle Isabel 53, but today occupied by the Museo de la Historia de Ponce is one of a group of stylistically eclectic houses built in Ponce between 1900 and 1915. Designed by architect Blas C. Silva in 1911, the building reflects an emerging tendency to incorporate freely disparate and competing architectural motifs. The facade is distinctly rendered in rococo and Moorish detailing to emphasize its bi-functional character as a home and an office respectively.

=== Marina 27 ===
The "fin de siecle" detailing and wall paintings present a material document of the 19th-century European immigration to Puerto Rico and the way of life of the landed bourgeois Criollo (Creole) class. In the architecture of Ponce of the period, elements of the Puerto Rican folk dwelling are integrated to Spanish and French-influenced classical detailing, thus resulting in a Ponce-Creole Architecture, of which the Zaldo de Nebot Residence at Calle Marina #27 is a prime example.

== Galleries ==
=== Sample designs ===
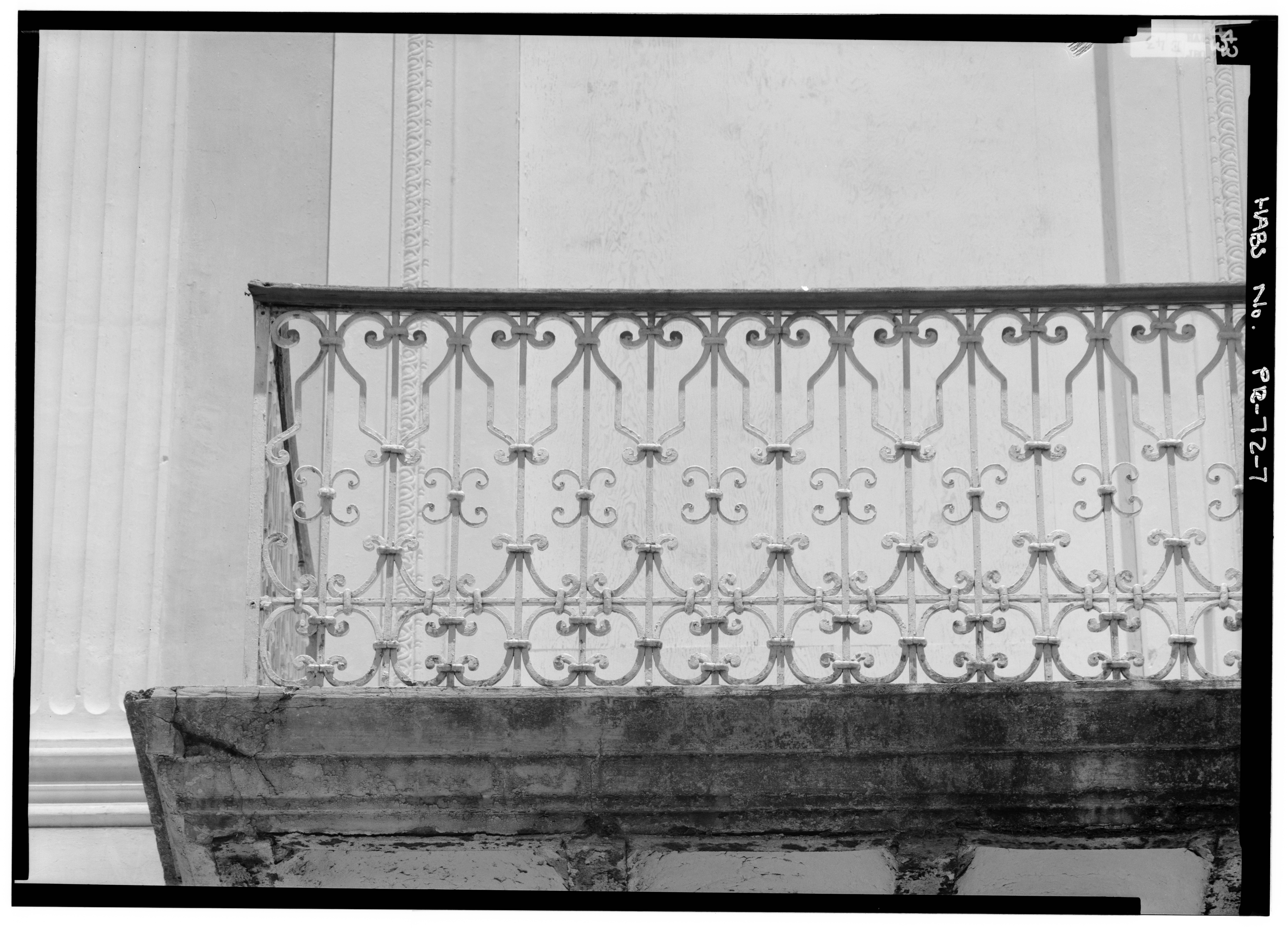
Typical wrought-iron balcony of the Ponce Creole architecture at Calle Amor #3 (Casa Fernando Vendrell)

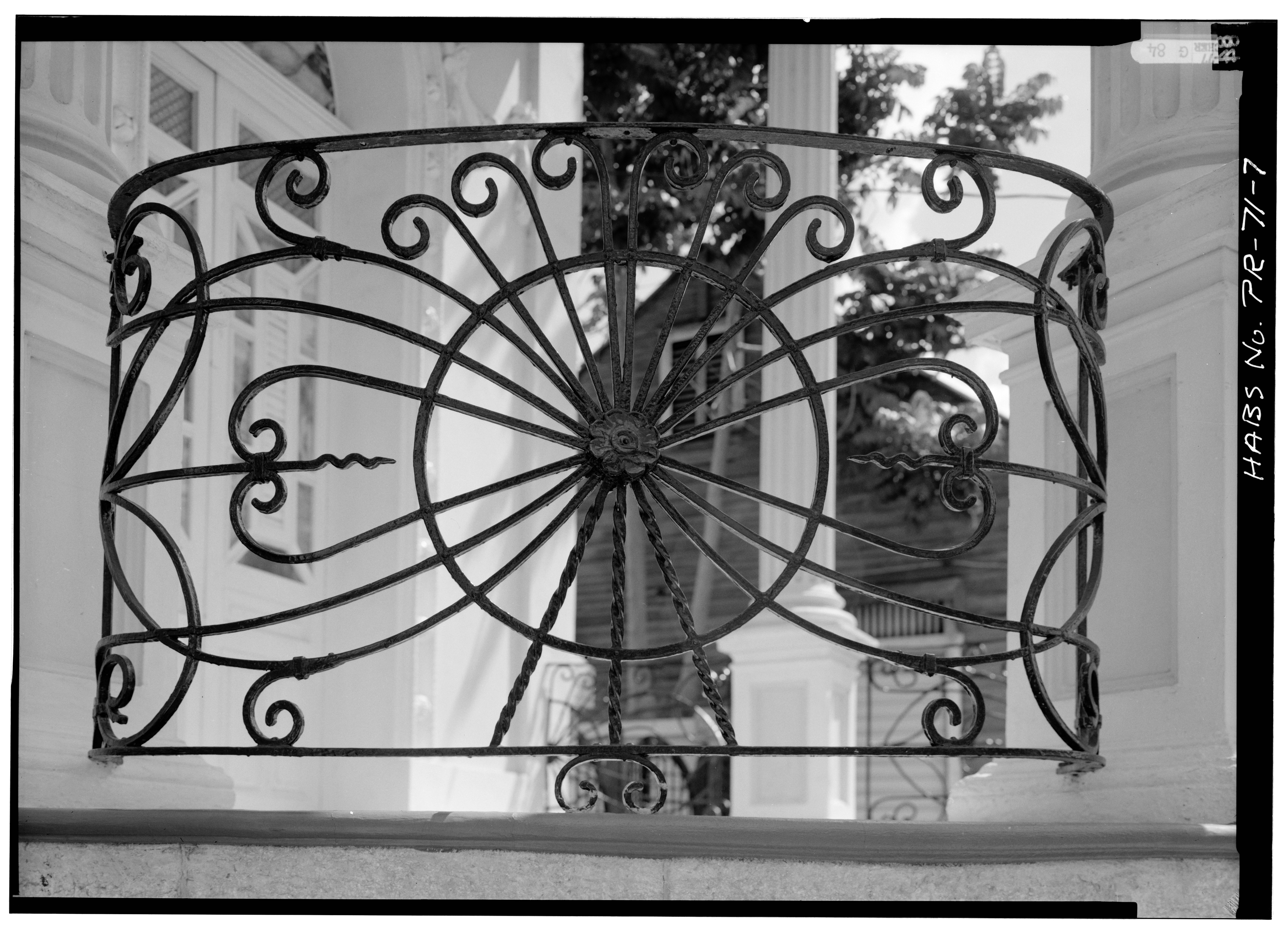
Typical wrought-iron balcony of the Ponce Creole architecture at Calle Castillo #34 (Casa Federico Font)

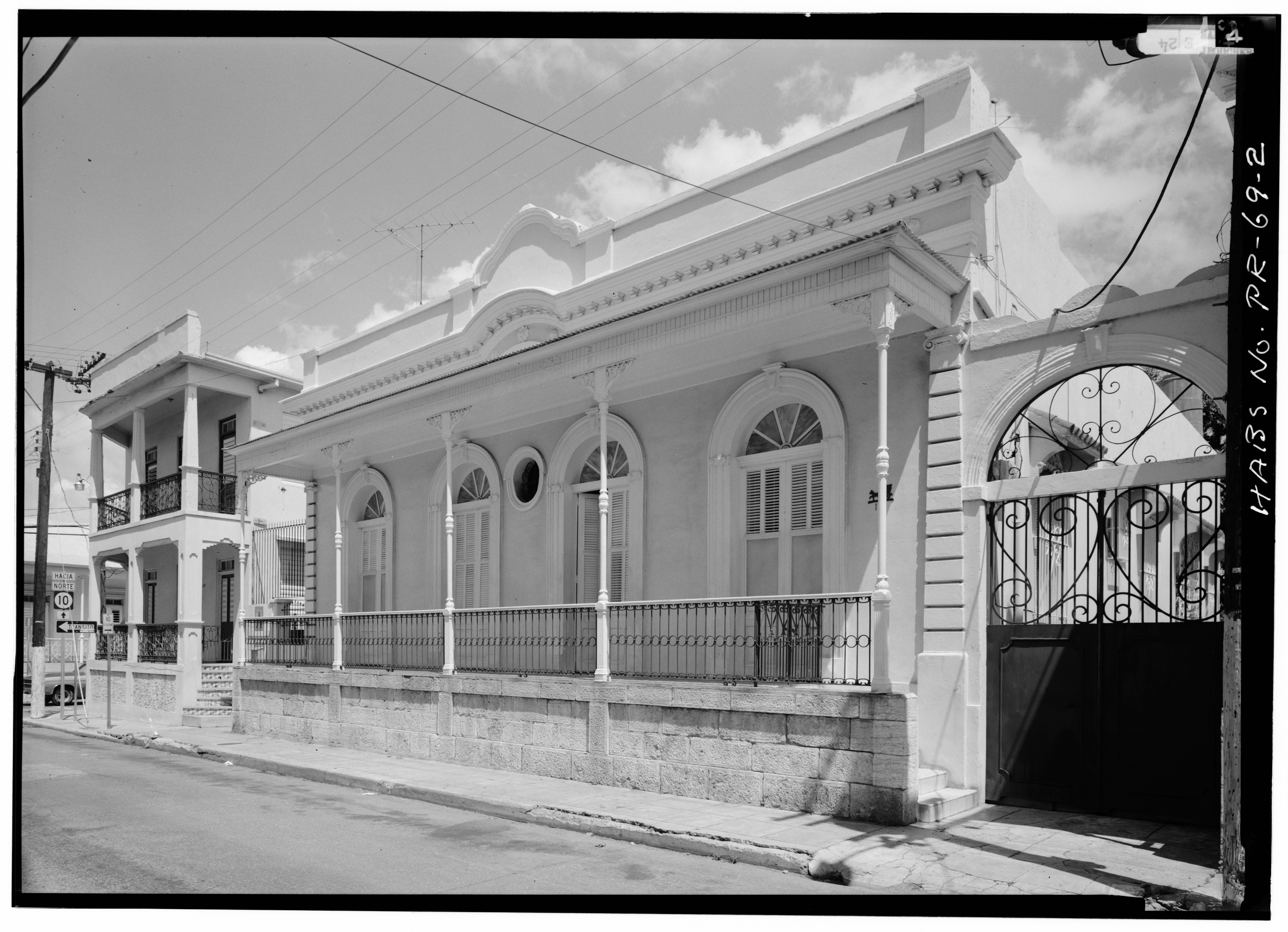
Long front porch in the Ponce Creole style at Calle Reina #118 (Casa Margarita Bestard)

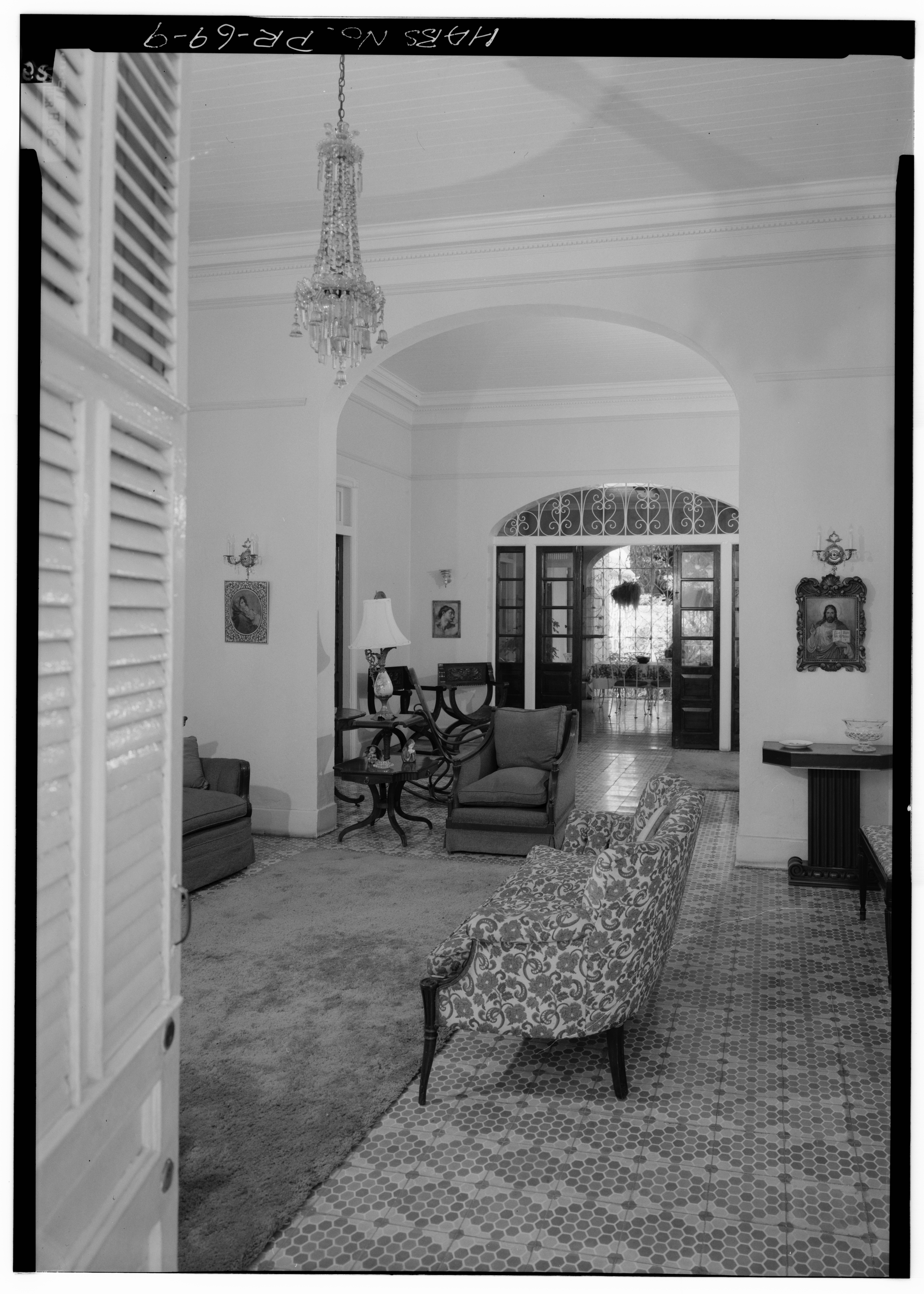
A "Contrapunto" separating two living spaces common in Ponce Creole rendering, shown at this Calle Reina #118 home (Casa Margarita Bestard)

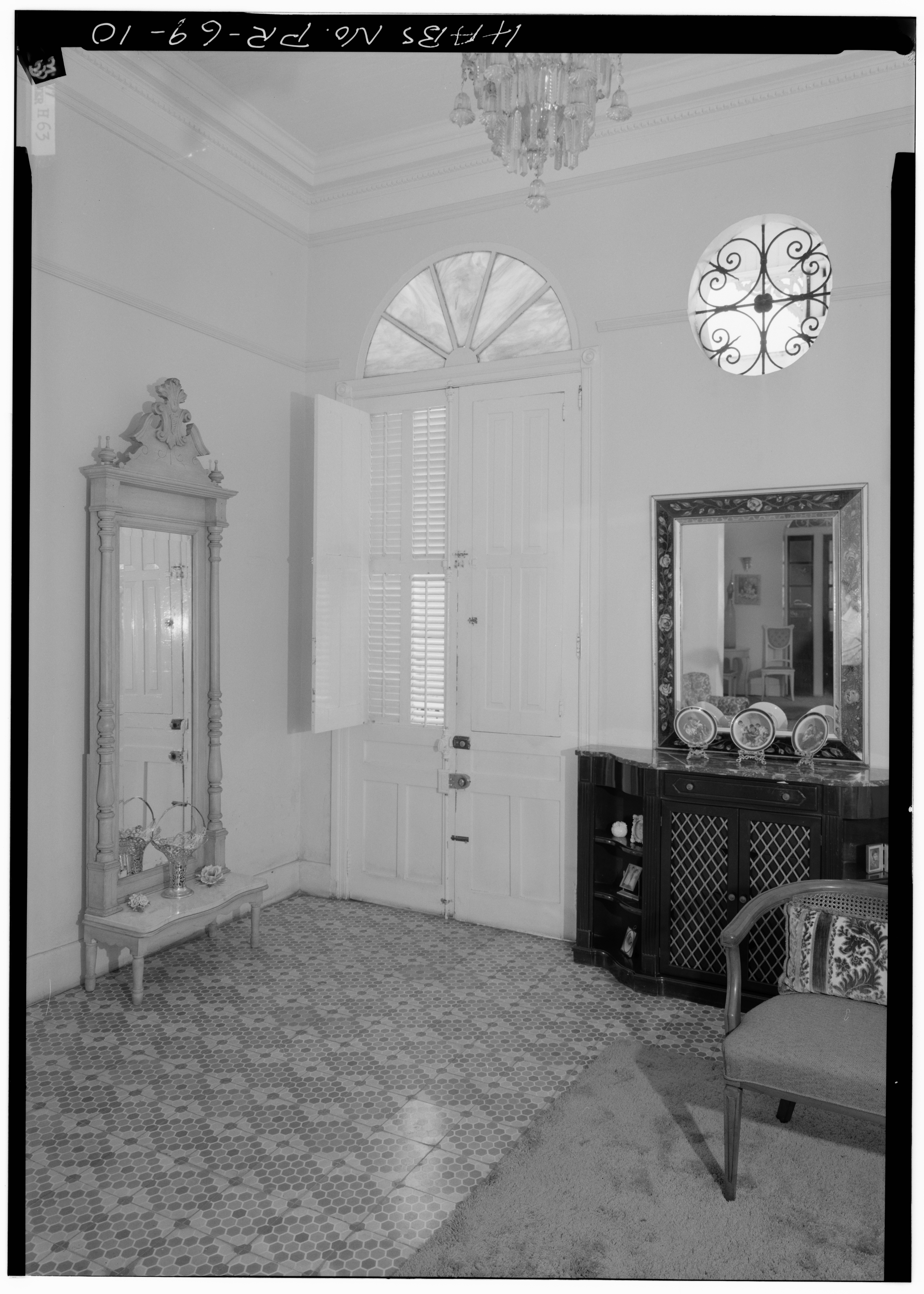
An "Ojo de buey" (Bull's eye) high on the wall allowed for hot summer southern Puerto Rico air to escape from the occupied areas

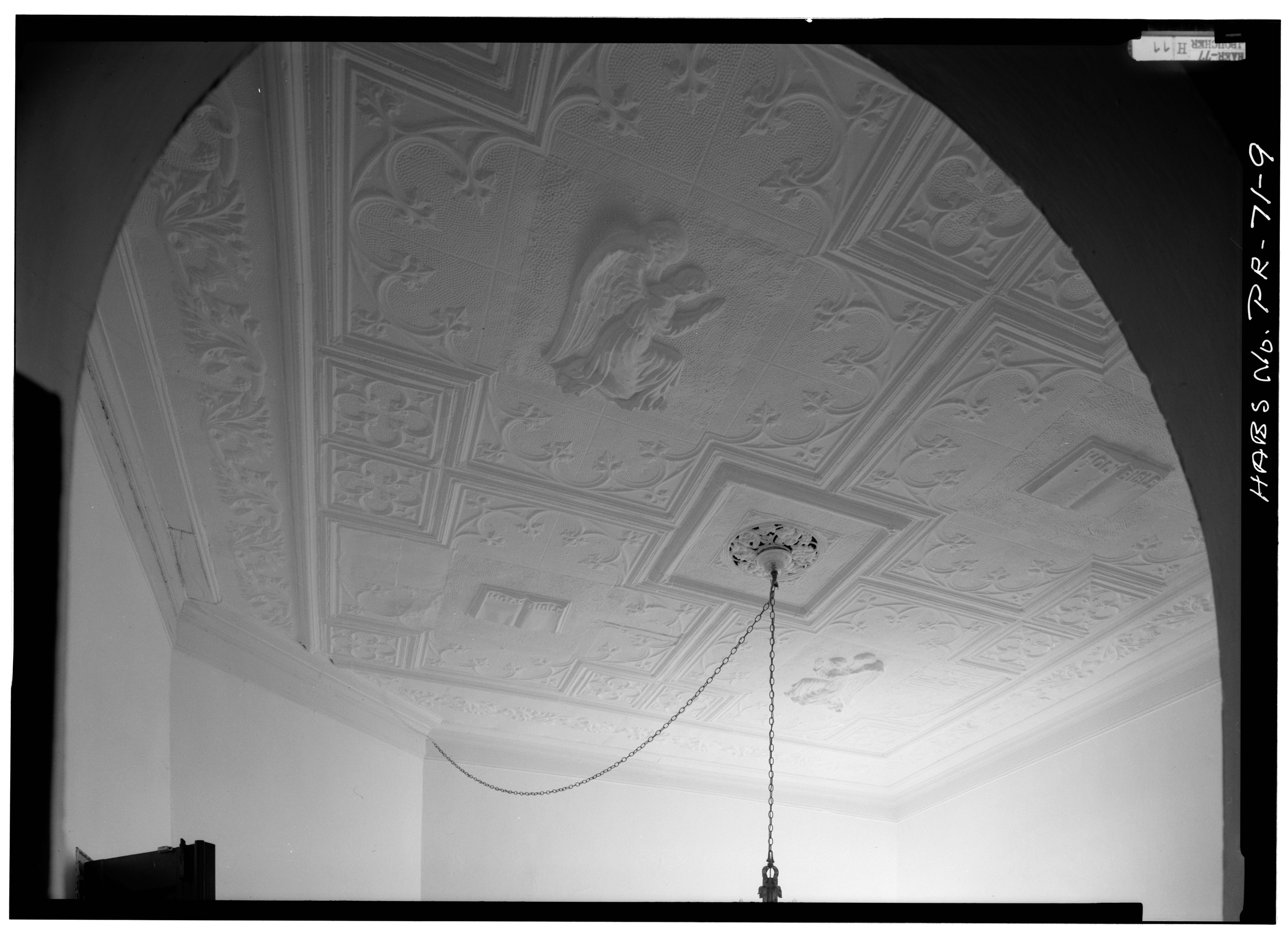
Decorative ceiling of a home built in the Ponce Creole tradition at Calle Castillo #34 (Casa Federico Font)

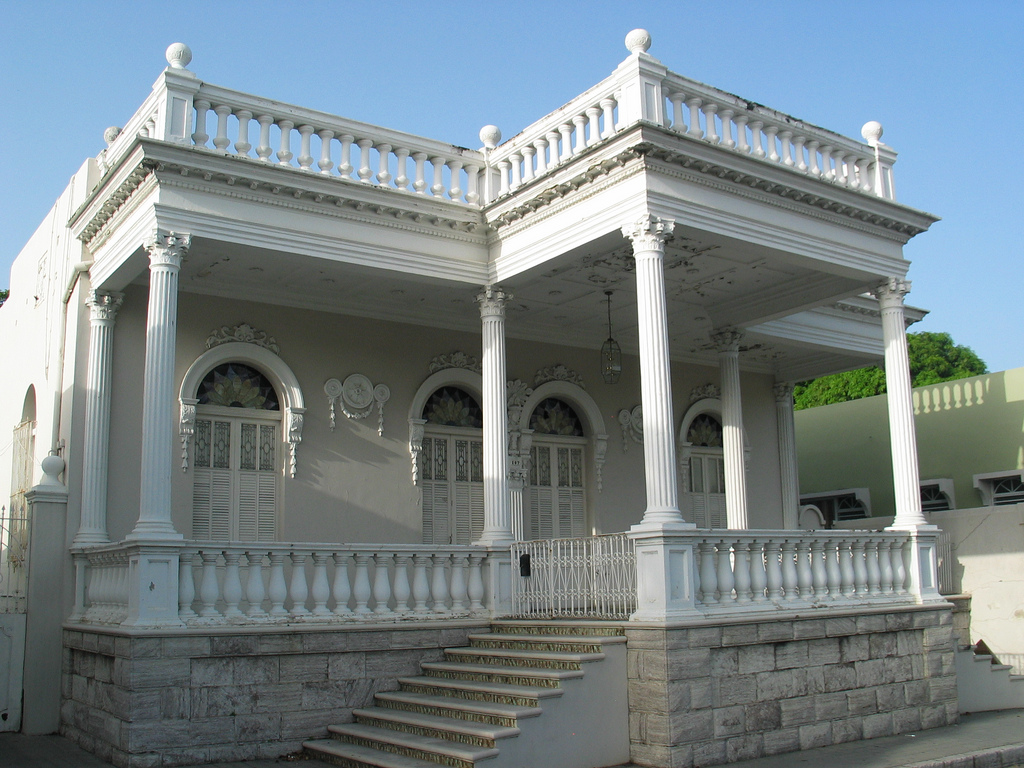
Corinthian columns at Calle Reina #107 (Residencia Subirá)

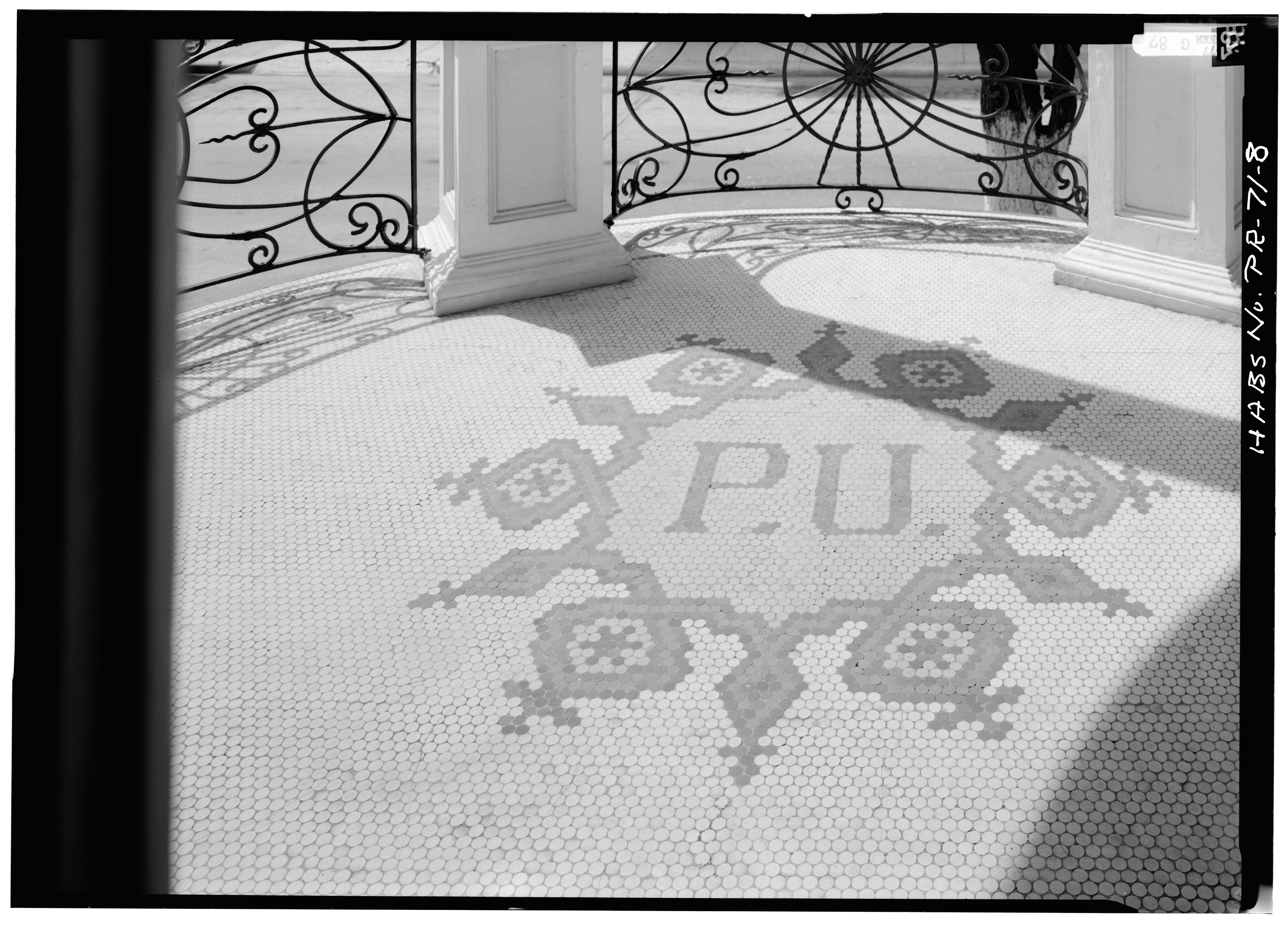
Locally manufactured decorative tiles accentuate the home at Calle Castillo #34 (Casa Federico Font)

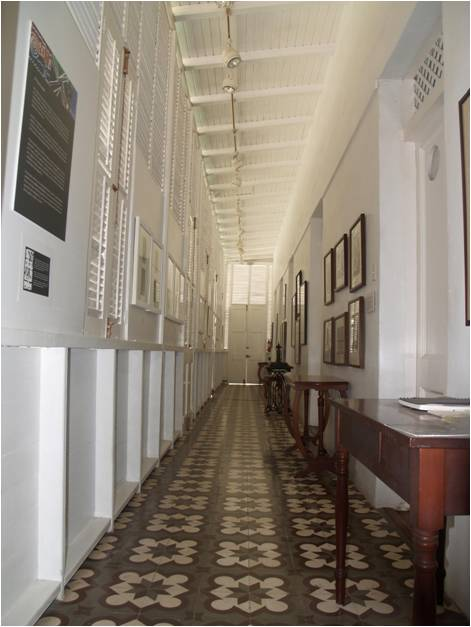
Interior view of a gallery with fixed wood louvers in a "martillo" (ell) extension to the house at Calle Mayor #14 (Casa Paoli)

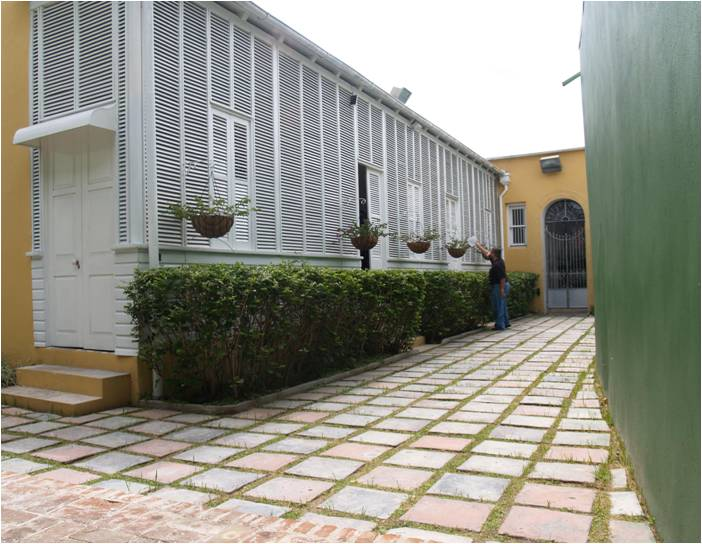
Exterior view of a gallery with fixed wood louvers in a "martillo" (ell) extension to the house at Calle Mayor #14 (Casa Paoli)

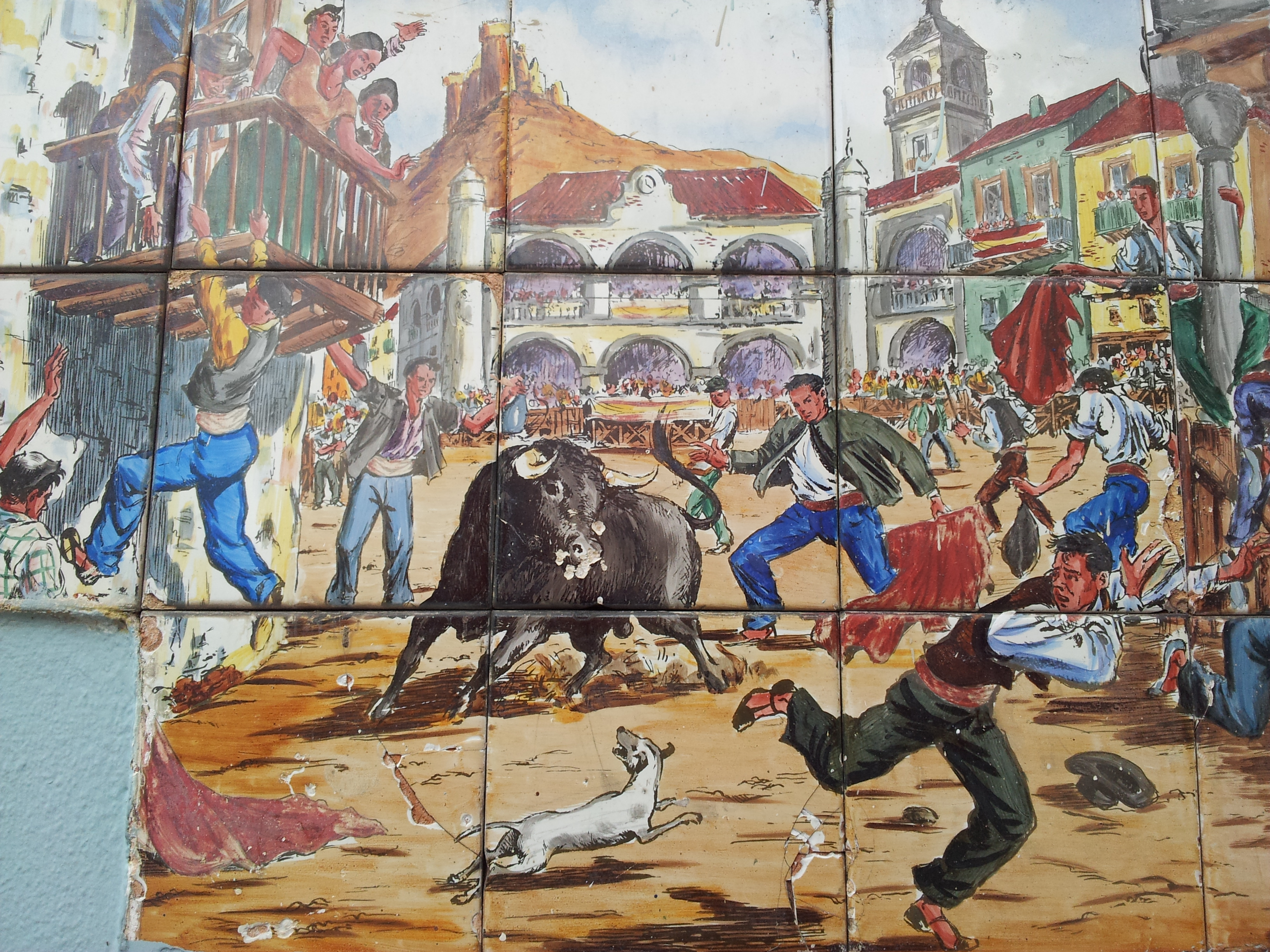
Locally manufactured decorative tiles (azulejos) accentuate the backyard entertainment area of Casa Serrallés on Calle Isabel SE corner with Calle Salud

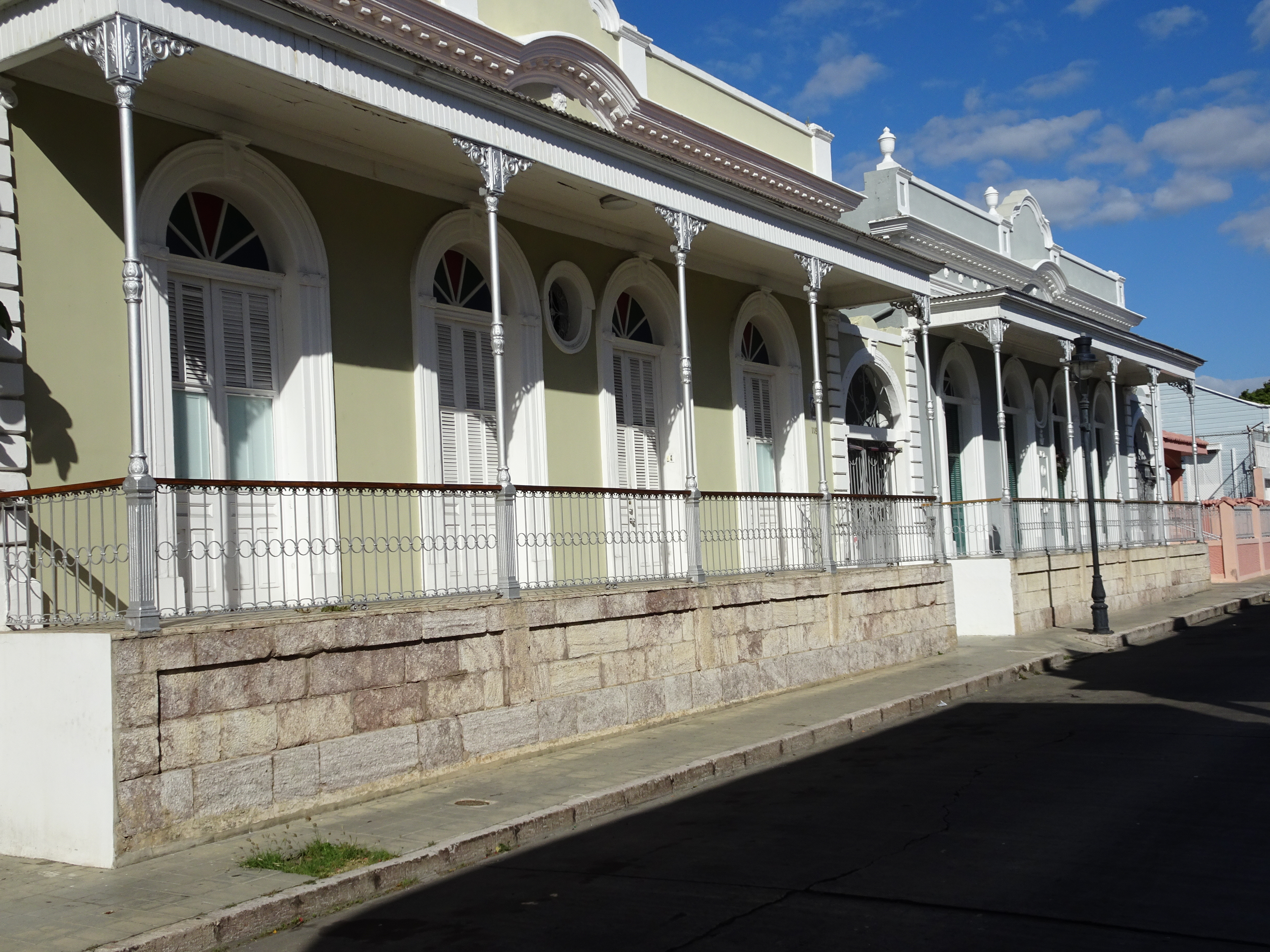
broad columned porches and balconies painted in the lime colors on Calle Reina #118

=== Architects in this movement ===
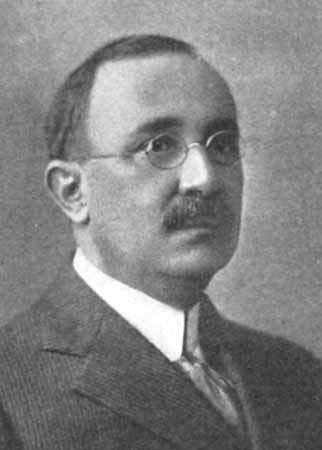
Manuel V. Domenech

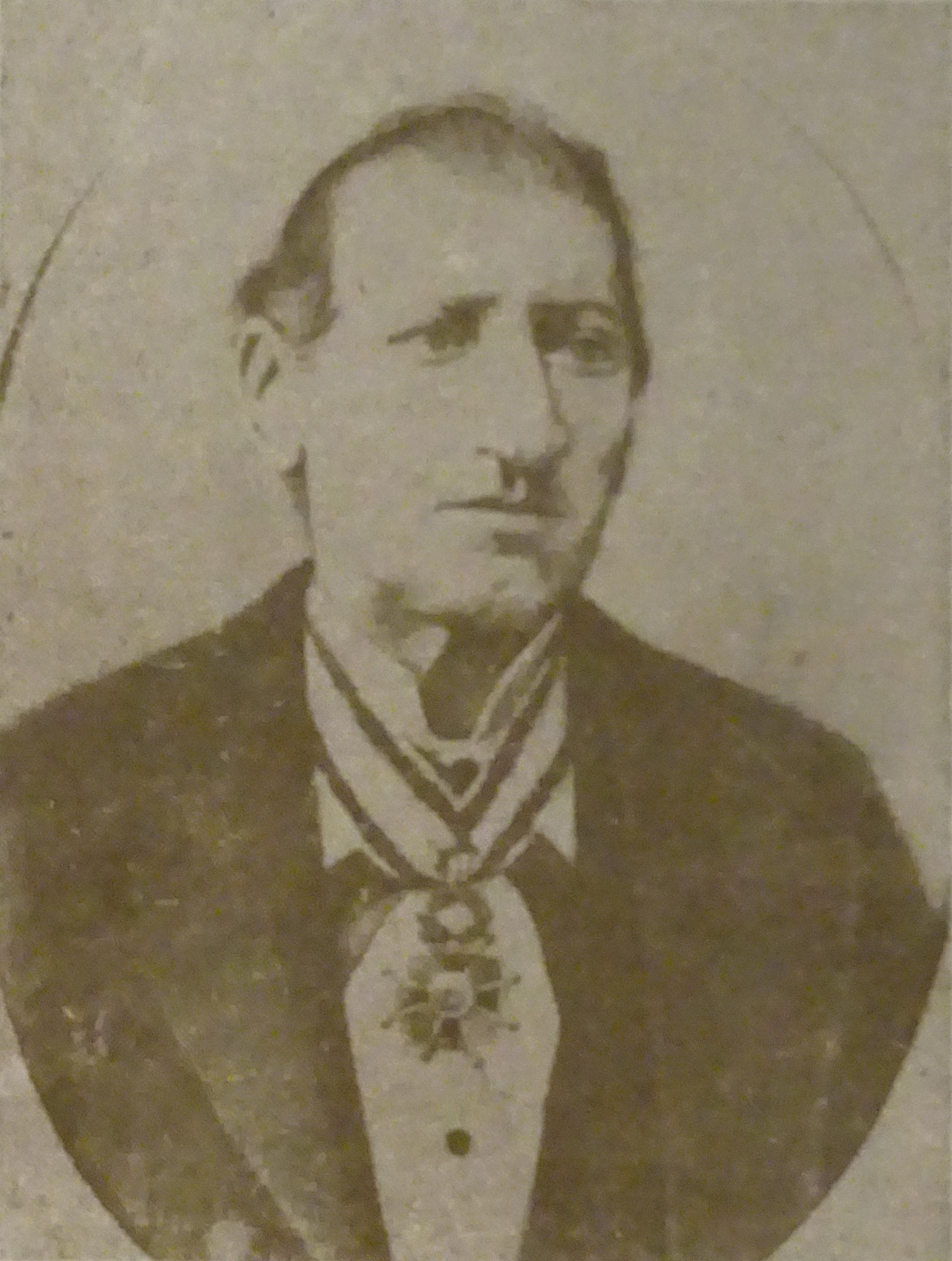
Juan Bertoli Calderoni

== See also ==
- Neoclásico Isabelino
