= Residencia Subirá =

Historic house in Ponce, Puerto Rico

- Subirá House
- U.S. National Register of Historic Places
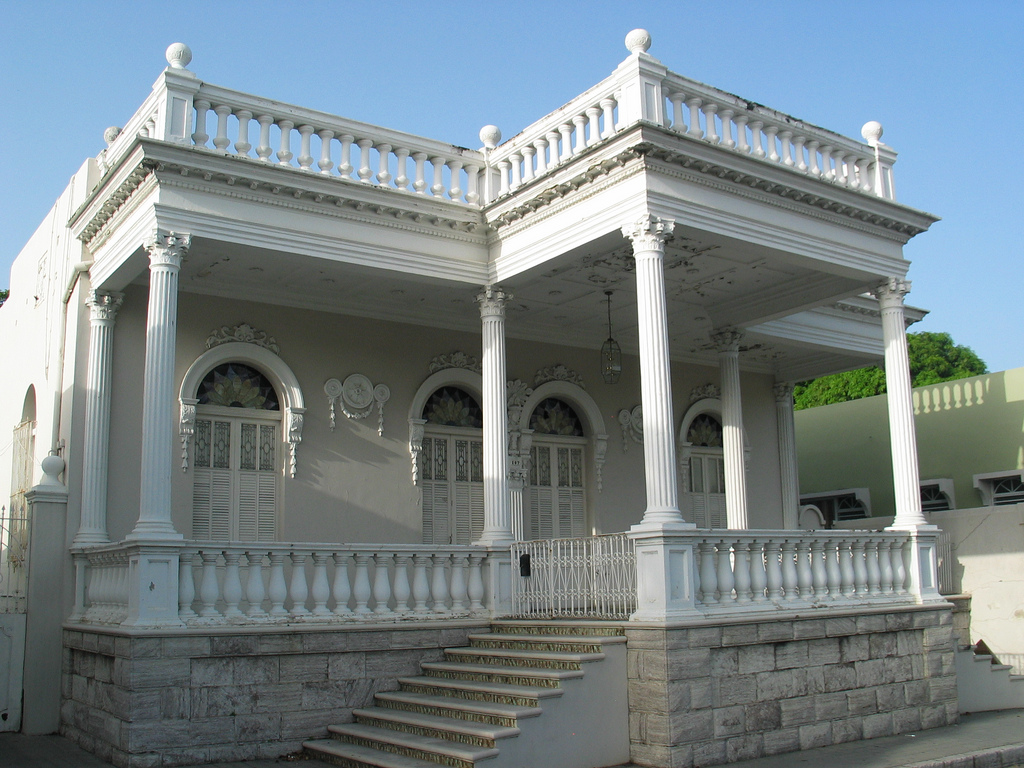
- The Historic Subira Residence in Barrio Segundo

- Location within Puerto Rico
- Location: Calle Reina 107; Ponce, Puerto Rico
- Coordinates: 18°00′43″N 66°36′58″W
- Area: < 1 acre
- Built: 1910
- Architect: Blas C. Silva
- Architectural style: Ponce Creole
- NRHP reference No.: 87001826
- Added to NRHP: October 28, 1987

The Residencia Subirá (Subirá Residence), also known as Residencia Frau (Frau Residence), is a historic building located on Reina Street in Ponce, Puerto Rico, in the city's historic district. The building dates from 1910. It was designed by the architect Blas Silva. The architecture follows the Ponce Creole tradition.

== History ==
Built in 1910, this house was a wedding gift from Asisclo Subirá Ramírez de Arellano and María Echevarría Alvarado to their daughter, Concepción Subirá Echevarría, and her husband, Manuel Frau de la Sierra. The house has always been used as a family residence and has been home to three generations of this family. It is currently (January 25, 2010) owned by William González and his three sons through his marriage with Mercedes Frau Subirá, daughter of the original owners, Concepción Subirá Echevarría and Manuel Frau de la Sierra.

== Significance ==
The Subirá Residence (Frau Residence) is considered a prime example of the architecture of Ponce's aristocracy of the late 19th and early 20th centuries. This structure is one of the remaining symbols of Ponce's "Golden Period" in which landed families lived in the urban core and large numbers of immigrants from Europe, Latin America and the other Antilles had turned the originally small settlement of Ponce into the cultural capital of Puerto Rico. The Ponce Creole architecture to which this building belongs is vital in itself since it represents the birth of a high-style native architecture, a hybrid of influences rather than the purely Spanish, or spontaneous vernacular expressions of previous centuries.

In particular, the Frau Residence is significant within this genre as it was designed by one of Ponce's most well-known architects, Blas Silva. Silva was particularly renowned among the wealthy classes of the period. His buildings are usually characterized by what is popularly referred to as "wedding-cake architecture" of the landed nouveau riche, for the richness of ornament and detail. Other buildings by Silva include the Monsanto Residence and the Salazar-Candal Residence, both listed in the NRHP.

The Frau Residence has been classed as one of Silva's most reserved houses, architecturally, as it is relatively simple and not as richly detailed as others. Rather, it relies on scale and form, and the beauty of the classical elements themselves, more than upon the applied ornamentation to portray the prominence of the original residents. It also remains very faithful to the traditional vernacular house type of the region, in plan and in execution, resulting in a graceful, refined version of the one-storey, full-width front porch house of the southern coast of Puerto Rico. In addition to the local influences, Silva reflects the interests of the Arts and Crafts movement and the academicism of the Ecole des Beaux Arts in the facade treatment, resulting in an austere and grand, yet lightweight elevation. Thus, Silva, as had other foreign-trained architects, succeeded in integrating classical education with the traditional elements of the Spanish Caribbean.

The Residence is also significant based on its location. Its location, only two blocks away from the main urban plaza of Ponce, places the Frau Residence into the "inner circle" of the historic urban core of Ponce.

== Description ==
The Frau Residence, at Calle Reina No. 107, is a raised, one-storey, stone, brick-masonry, and plaster structure with a flat roof. It is located on the south side of the street between Calle Mendez Vigo and Calle Torres in the historic urban center of Ponce. In plan, the structure is organized in an inverted "L" shape around a side court at the rear-left.

An ample gallery raised on a local-stone podium spans the width of the facade, the central one-third portion projecting forward approximately six feet in a square form. Defining the porch is a series of Corinthian columns raised upon a concrete balustrade, one at each intersection of two perpendicular planes. These columns support a full-entablature, ornate cornice and balustered parapet with pommels over each column. Bilateral stairs access the verandah from either side of the projecting central section. The steps contain marble treads and polychrome tile risers.

Within the verandah, four bays are organized into an ABA rhythm of two paired, central bays flanked by singular bays at the extremes. Each bay is intricately articulated in the same manner: a circular arch defined by an ornate hood mould with floral and festoon plaster ornament above. Each bay contains wooden, louvered double-doors with ornate leaded glass panels and a stained-glass fanlight.

Between the paired, central bays is an articulate, full-relief, feminine bust sculpture occupying the spandrel area. Plaster ornaments composed of two small, circular medallions flanking a larger, central one decorate the areas between bays 1-2 and 3–4.

In plan, the living room, dining room, and finally a louvered gallery overlooking the side garden are disposed in sequence from front to rear. Bedrooms open onto the gallery around the court. Interior spaces are large and generally have high ceilings and the floors are covered with Loza Islena (Native ceramic tile) in intricate designs. Of particular significance are the stained-glass panels found at the transoms of the main doors and the circular window in the bathroom.

Alterations to the house have been limited to reversible wooden partitions within some of the interior spaces and the installation of modern, metal-based, hurricane impact resistant windows ("Miami windows") in some areas. The overall character of the interior spaces has not changed nonetheless, and the exterior of the premises remains faithful to the original design.

== See also ==
- Archivo Historico de Ponce. Teatro La Perla (now at the Ponce Municipal Library) Ponce, Puerto Rico.
- Colegio de Arquitectos de Puerto Rico. Estudio Arquitectonico de Ponce, 1985
