= Casa Font-Ubides =

Historic house in Ponce, Puerto Rico

- Font–Ubides House
- U.S. National Register of Historic Places
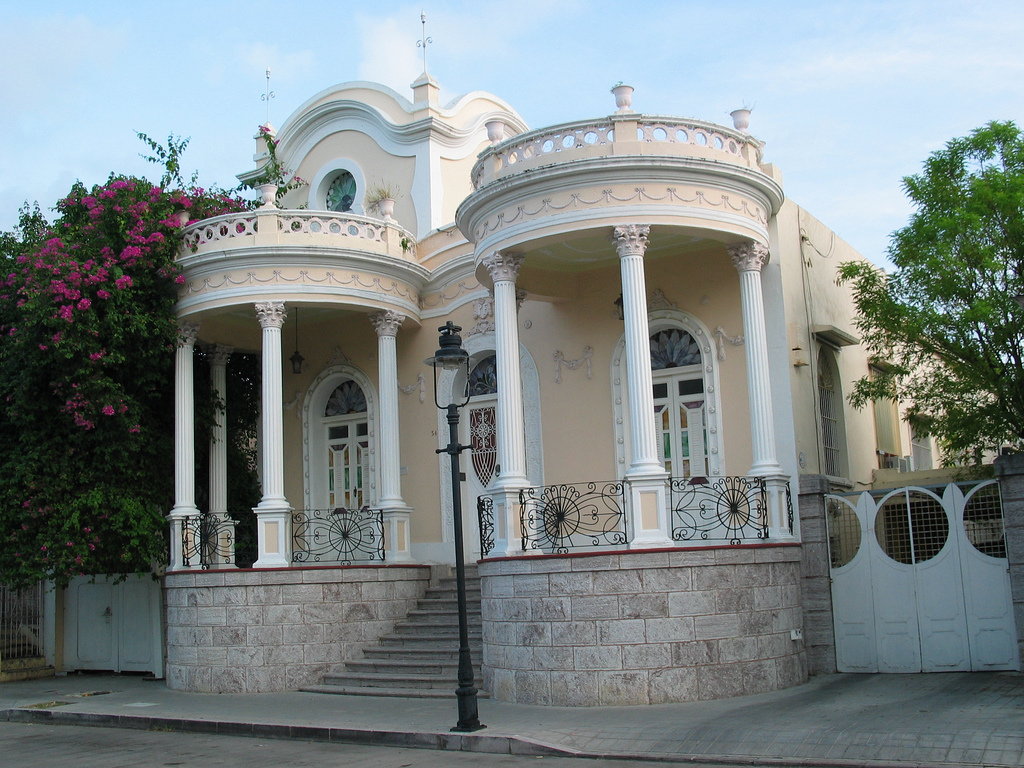
- Residencia Font-Ubides in 2010

- Location within Puerto Rico
- Location: Calle Castillo No. 34, Ponce, Puerto Rico
- Coordinates: 18°00′54″N 66°36′39″W
- Area: < 1 acre
- Built: 1913
- Architect: Bias C. Silva
- Architectural style: Neoclassical architecture, Art Nouveau
- NRHP reference No.: 87001825
- Added to NRHP: 29 October 1987

Casa Font-Ubides (English: Font-Ubides House), also known as the Residencia Monsanto (English: Monsanto Residence) is a historic building located on the north side of Castillo Street in Ponce, Puerto Rico, in the city's historic district. The building dates from 1913. It was designed by the architect Blas Silva. The architecture consists of 19th Classical revival and Art Nouveau architectural styles. The building is of architectural significance for its aggressive incorporation of curvilinear forms and ornaments. The complete preservation of the original architecture of the Monsanto Residence, its unique design amongst the houses of Ponce, and its location within the historic urban core of the city qualify it as one of a series of grand houses and an integral part of the character of Ponce.

== Significance ==
The Monsanto Residence at Calle Castillo No.34 is an architectural landmark in the city of Ponce. Designed by the well-known architect Blas Silva in 1913, the residence stands out among the great houses of Ponce for its aggressive incorporation of curvilinear forms and ornament. Adapting the curves of the "Art Nouveau" to the persistent Neo-classicism of Puerto Rico and the recently born Creole vocabulary of Ponce, Silva succeeded in creating a movement in architecture which broke away from the traditional forms while remaining within them. The traditional continuous raised verandah along the front facade is broken up into two and twisted out of its usual linearity into the curved forms preserved today. Characteristic of the architecture to abound in Ponce contemporaneous to Castillo 34 is a profusion of appliqué, and eclectic combination and juxtaposition of shapes, particularly curvilinear, and a general ostentation of articulation. Blas Silva was probably the most established of the "wedding-cake architects" and was thus sought after mostly by the "nouveau riche" of the period. Silva's houses are among the richest in Ponce, among which the Monsanto Residence stands put for its circular porches. Other buildings by Blas Silva include the Frau Residence and the Salazar-Candal Residence, both also listed in the NRHP.

== Physical appearance and description ==
The Monsanto Residence, located at 34 Castillo Street, is a one-storey, detached, masonry and stone building on the north side of the street, between Virtud and Salud Streets, in the Ponce Historic Zone. The house consists of plastered masonry at the living level and pinkstone ashlar at the podium. Excessive ornamentation and exuberance of volumes denominates this house as what is known locally as "wedding cake architecture."

The facade is organized into three similar bays, each one consisting of a narrow, arched doorway with wooden panel double-doors, stained-glass lights and tiffany-style stained-glass fanlights. The central entrance doors contain wrought-iron panels in curved Art Nouveau lines. Each opening is articulated with intricate, decorative plaster surrounds and flaked with plaster festoon mouldings. In addition, the central entry is crowned with a plaster cartouche displaying the initials of the first owners, PF (Providencia Ubides and Federico Font).

A heavily ornamented three-bay facade is shaded by two gazebo-like front terraces. Each bay consists of a series of four Corinthian columns upon pedestals, arranged around a 3/4-circle plan. Decorative wrought-iron railings in curvilinear Art Nouveau designs span between each of the pedestals.

Each series of columns supports a cornice with a festooned frieze and a parapet above, decorated with circular-wreath balusters. The cornice wraps around the two porches, connecting the two in a curved pediment motif above the central entrance. Roman amphorae are located above the parapet, one at the location of each column.

A second-floor "mirador" or "belvedere" projects upward above the first bay in a baroque manner. The volume is generally cubical in proportions, capped with an upwardly-curving cornice on each of its four sides, thus creating a groin-vault roof and ceiling. A small masonry pinnacle is located above the cornice at each of the four corners of the mirador and a circular oculus with stained glass panels occupies each of the four sides.

A curvilinear stair or "stoop" conforms to the space available between the podiums of the two terraces, flowing up to the central entry. Once inside, a long, narrow hallway extends back from the street entry. Parlors and bedrooms open onto the hallway at either side, and the hallway terminates at a grand dining room at rear, with a kitchen at left and a terrace along the entire rear wall of the house. The upper level mirador is accessed by a cast-iron spiral staircase located on the southeast corner of the parlor at bay 1. Characteristic interior features of the house include: decorative native ceramic tile floors, intricate, pressed-tin ceilings in biblical motifs, and skillfully carved wooden fanlights.

== See also ==
- Efrain Perez-Chanis, Gran Enciclopedia de Puerto Rico, Arquitectura.
- Archivo Histórico de Ponce, Teatro La Perla, Ponce.
- Revista Plástica, Liga de Arte de San Juan, No. 15, Vol. 2, Sept. 1986.
