= Museo de la Historia de Ponce =

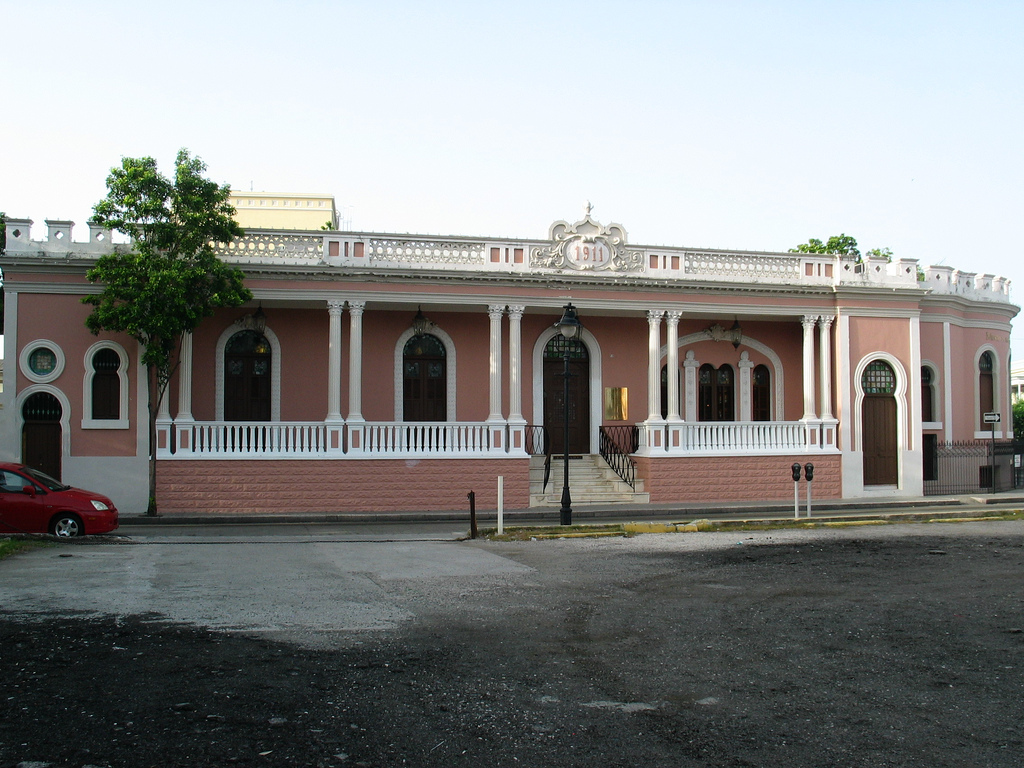
- Museo de la Historia de Ponce on Calle Isabel and Calle Mayor Cantera

- Location within Puerto Rico
- Established: 12 December 1992
- Location: Calle Isabel #53, SE corner of Calle Isabel & Calle Mayor, Ponce, Puerto Rico
- Coordinates: 18°00′45″N 66°36′42″W
- Type: History museum
- Visitors: 12,464 (2000)
- Director: Jorge Alberto Figueroa Irizarry
- Curators: Ms. Maruja Candal Salazar; Neysa Rodriguez Deynes
- Owner: Autonomous Municipality of Ponce
- Website: Website

The Museo de la Historia de Ponce (Museum of the History of Ponce) is a local history museum located in the historic Casa Salazar-Candal in the city of Ponce, Puerto Rico. The museum depicts the city's ecology, economy, architecture, government, and elements of daily life. It seeks to promote the research, conservation, and dissemination of the historic heritage of Ponce and Puerto Rico.

Inaugurated on 12 December 1992, it was the first museum in Puerto Rico established to cover the history of the people of a town or city. It traces the city's history from the Taino Indians to today. The museum was inaugurated under the administration of Mayor Rafael Cordero Santiago, as part of the tricentennial celebration of the founding of the city.

It is located in the historic district of the city, a short two-block walk from the central Plaza Las Delicias town square, at the southeast corner of Isabel and Mayor Cantera streets. The museum proper is housed in the historic Casa Salazar-Candal but also includes the neighboring Rosali-Zapater house, which houses administratives offices of the museum, in addition to the empty lot that once held the residence of the Schuck Gelpí family. In 2012, plans were announced to expand the museum into the Casa Rosita Serrallés, an adjacent property. In 2014, Casa Rosita Serralles (Calle Salud street #67) joined Museo de la Historia de Ponce and opened as "Museo de la Recordacion Barrio Mameyes" (Barrio Mameyes Memorial Museum) under Ponce mayor María Meléndez. It is also known as "Sala Memorial del Barrio Mameyes" as it operates as a part of the Museo de la Historia de Ponce.

== History of the museum ==
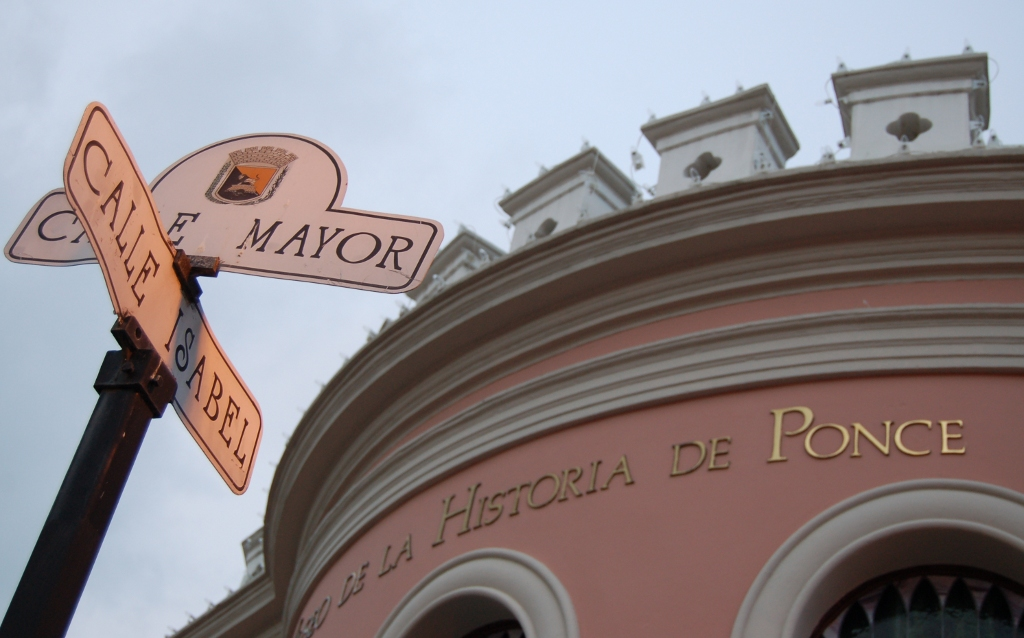
Part of the front facade of the Museo de la Historia de Ponce at Calle Mayor and Calle Isabel streets

The idea of creating a Ponce history museum dates back to the 1930s, following a citizens group's initiative, but the project did not materialize then. Interest in the proposal revived years later under Ponce's Secretariat of Culture. The plan visualized a museum to be constructed on the block bordered by Isabel, Mayor, Cristina, and Salud streets, and Casa Salazar and Casa Zapater, two historic homes, were acquired, as was the empty lot where Casa Shuck Gelpí had once stood. However, the project came to a standstill once again.

The plan was revived once again, but with modifications, at the end of the 1980s. This time the project came under the direction of Ms. Maruja Candal Salazar and Dr. Neysa Rodríguez Deynes (curator and founder). They worked in conjunction with a team of curators that included Lizette Cabrera Salcedo, Dr. José Molinelli, Alberto del Toro, and J. A. Figueroa Irizarry, as well as museum specialists Aníbal Sepúlveda, Néstor Barretto, and Jorge Carbonell, members of the Carimar Research Center. The four-year period from 1989 to 1992 saw the restoration of the Salazar and Zapater houses to serve as home to the museum, and the completion of the research, planning, and design of its first four permanent exhibit halls of the museum, namely, ecology, panorama, economic activity, and architecture.

In 1994, the second phase of the project was initiated, under the direction of Lizette Cabrera Salcedo: the creation of two permanent exhibits, one focused on health and one entitled "Ponce in Puerto Rican Political Life", in addition to a multimedia presentation "Ponce is Ponce." In 1998, the Ernesto Ramos Antonini auditorium, designed by architect José Bermúdez, was inaugurated under the direction of Lizette Cabrera Salcedo, at the location of the old Shuck Gelpí House.

== Currently ==
By 2002, ten years after its founding, the Museum of the History of Ponce had become one of Puerto Rico's most active cultural centers, and Puerto Rico's most complete history museum. The museum provides a variety of cultural offerings intended to strengthen and increase awareness of the study of Puerto Rican and Ponceño history. As part of the 10th anniversary celebrations, the third and last phase of the museum's development was begun. It included two permanent exhibits on education and daily life, and the creation of a general museum catalog.

== Building ==
The main building that houses the museum has stained-glass windows, mosaics, and interior patios. Both buildings where the museum is housed are turn-of-the-20th-century homes. The Salazar House dates from 1911 and was designed by Blas Silva Boucher in an eclectic neoclassical style. It is listed in the National Register of Historic Places. The Zapater home, on the other hand, represents the criollo townhouse typology. It was built in 1880 and rebuilt in 1925. The Zapater residence was home to some of Ponce's most notable families, including the Clausells, Dapena, Zapater, and Rosaly families. It was also designed by Blas Silva.

== Contents ==
The museum consists of 10 exhibition halls. It showcases facts, documents, objects, and relics of Ponce's history, demonstrating the importance of the city in the development of the history of Puerto Rico, including its intellectual, political, social, cultural, and economic aspects. It also covers the role of the city in the artistic development of Puerto Rican culture in the areas of music, theater, opera, literature, and journalism. Included in the exhibits are depictions of the ethnic cultures that influenced southern Puerto Rico culture, such as Spanish, African and non-European immigrants.

== The permanent exhibits of the museum ==
=== Ecology ===
The first exhibition hall depicts the land and climate of the municipality: its coast, plains, and mountains. It shows how the city's natural surroundings are the departure point for learning about its history. It includes a scale model of the municipality, with illustrations of its fertile soils, natural resources, and native fauna. The curator in charge of this exhibit was Dr. José Mollinelli, with sponsorship by CARIMAR.

=== Panorama ===
Human beings make an entrance in this exhibit describing how humans interact with their environment. The Panorama hall presents the origins of the settlement at Ponce and the evolution of its population from pre-Hispanic times through the beginnings of the 20th century. It includes the regions and countries from which the present inhabitants originated, emphasizing Ponce's heterogeneous populace. A scale model of the city shows Ponce in its greatest era of development, at the end of the 19th century. The curator in charge of this exhibit was Dra. Neysa Rodríguez Deynes, with sponsorship by CARIMAR.

=== Politics ===
This exhibit focuses on Ponce's role in Puerto Rico's politics and the local political life of the people of Ponce. The exhibit occupies two rooms. The first illustrates the political development of Puerto Rico from 1508 until the 1950s. Photographic murals, documents, photographs, and objects reveal the most significant periods in Puerto Rican political life and Ponce's leading role in this development. The second room explains the creation of the Estado Libre Asociado, and the life and work of governors native to Ponce: Luis A. Ferré and Rafael Hernández Colón, as well as Roberto Sánchez Vilella, who claimed Ponce as his adoptive city. Among the most significant pieces in this exhibition hall is the Prince of Asturias of Literature Prize (Premio Príncipe de Asturias de las Letras), a small bronze statue created by the famous Spanish sculptor Juan Miró.

=== Finance and Economics ===
One of the most significant themes in the museum, economic development, is the largest factor in the city's growth from its founding through the present day. The development of the port, agriculture, industry, and banking has supported Ponce's economic development, which in turn has significantly nourished its cultural, social, and intellectual development are evident in this exhibition hall. The curator in charge of this exhibit was Lizette Cabrera Salcedo, with sponsorship by CARIMAR.

=== Architecture and Urban Development ===
The evolution of Ponce's urban landscape is illustrated in successive periods of development. The exhibit presents the city's architects and highlights typical elements of Ponce's native architecture. It includes domestic, military, and institutional architecture, public works and the evolution of open space that define this city as a traditional urban center of importance. The hall includes a scale model of the city's urban development, and a photographic montage including plans, buildings, architects, and art installations. The curator in charge of this exhibit was Architect Alberto del Toro, with sponsorship by CARIMAR.

=== Health and Medicine ===
This exhibit shows the creation and evolution of Ponce's principal health institutions from 1863 until the present day and the medical community from the early 20th century until the 1940s. It also presents significant events in health, such as Dr. Bailey K. Ashford's discovery of the parasite that causes uncinaria ancylostomiasis (local ancylostomiasis) to the country's first kidney transplant. Included in this exhibit are documents, photographs, prescriptions, professional awards, and personal artifacts once belonging to various Ponce physicians.

== Collections ==
The process of putting together the collections involved over 200 of Ponce's own citizens who lent or donated the photographs, documents, and objects that make up the collections. The current collection has over 3,000 photographs, documents, pieces of furniture, and objects on display in the exhibition halls, or conserved in the museum's storage areas.

The most important collections include:

=== The Dr. Manuel de la Pila Iglesias collection ===
Covering the period from 1898 to 1950, this collection consists of documents, photographs, and personal objects of Dr. Manuel de la Pila Iglesias that show the evolution of health and medicine in Ponce during the early-to-middle 20th century.

=== The Juan Sisco Santiago collection ===
Covering the period from 1930 to 1980, this collection includes documents, publications, objects, and photographs by the famous Ponce photographer Juan Sisco Santiago, and illustrating the political, social, cultural and economic daily life of Ponce during the second half of the 20th century.

=== The Dr. Ana Dolores Pérez Marchand collection ===
Covering the period from 1911 to 1950, this collection includes photographs, documents, publications, and personal items of Ponce's first female physician, Ana Dolores Pérez Marchand. Dr. Pérez Marchand was also one of the first three female physician in Puerto Rico. This collection provides a valuable resource for studying the role of women during the early 20th century, and the development of health and medicine in Puerto Rico in general.

=== The Emilio J. Pasarell collection ===
Covering the period from 1900 to 1920, this collection includes postcards by Ponce photographer José Rodríguez Serra. The collection was donated by the Emilio J. Pasarell succession. These offer a visual panorama of Ponce's streets, public and private buildings, plazas, and businesses in the first two decades of the 20th century.

=== The Mariana Suárez de Longo collection ===
This collection covers the period from 1949 to 1970. It consists of correspondence, invitations, graduation cards, newspaper clippings, telegrams, and photographs of educational activities in Ponce between 1949 and 1970.

=== The Ramón López Crespo collection ===
The Ramón López Crespo collection covers the period from 1960 to 1980. It consists of photographs, posters, programs of cultural events, magazines, letters, newspapers, postcards, flyers for musical and theatrical events, illustrating cultural life and events in Ponce between 1960 and 1980.

== See also ==
- Casa Salazar-Candal
