= Ana Dolores Pérez Marchand =

Puerto Rican physician

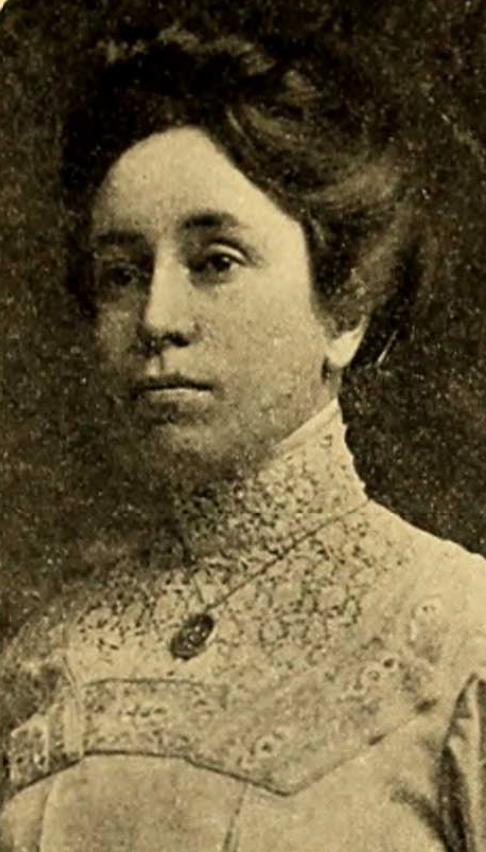
- Dolores Pérez Marchand, from the 1911 yearbook of the Woman's Medical College of Pennsylvania
- Born: 17 April 1885; Utuado, Puerto Rico
- Died: 19 January 1983 (aged 97); Ponce, Puerto Rico
- Other name: Lola Pérez Marchand
- Education: Woman's Medical College of Pennsylvania (MD)
- Occupations: Physician, obstetrician

Ana Dolores Pérez Marchand (17 April 1885 – 19 January 1983) was a Puerto Rican physician and suffragist, one of the first Puerto Rican women to earn a medical degree.

== Early life and education ==
Pérez Marchand was born in Utuado, and raised in Ponce, the daughter of Vicente Pérez Andújar and Monserrat Marchand Muñoz. She attended Wilson College in Pennsylvania. She completed her medical at the Woman's Medical College of Pennsylvania in 1911, where she was also editor-in-chief of the yearbook. She was one of the first Puerto Rican women to earn a medical degree. She completed further studies in obstetrics, gynecology, and urology at Johns Hopkins University, and at hospitals in Baltimore and New York.

== Career ==
Pérez Marchand was active in the causes of women's suffrage and prohibition in Puerto Rico. She was president of the Puerto Rican Women's League in Ponce. Beginning in 1914, Pérez Marchand was an obstetrician at the Hospital de Damas in Ponce. In 1928 she lectured in Virginia on child health. In 1933 she was removed from her civil service position as medical obstetrician for political reasons, and appealed the decision up to the Supreme Court of Puerto Rico in 1935, but the removal was permitted to stand.

== Personal life and legacy ==
Pérez Marchand married Ramón Gerónimo Goyco in 1914; they had a daughter, Irene, and later divorced. She died in 1983, aged 97 years, in Ponce. Her papers are in the Museo de la Historia de Ponce. There is a "Calle Ana D. Perez Marchand", named for her, in Ponce, she was buried at Cementerio Católico San Vicente de Paul also in Ponce.
