= Blas C. Silva Boucher =

Puerto Rican architect

Blas Silva
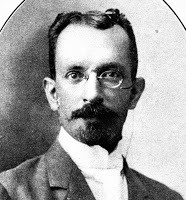
- Blas C. Silva Boucher, circa 1909
- Born: Blas C. Silva Boucher; 2 February 1869; Hormigueros, Puerto Rico
- Died: 27 January 1949 (aged 79); Ponce, Puerto Rico
- Known for: Engineering
- Notable work: Font-Ubides House, Subira Residence, Salazar-Candal House
- Movement: Ponce Creole architecture

Blas C. Silva Boucher (2 February 1869 – 27 January 1949) was a twentieth-century Puerto Rican engineer from Ponce, Puerto Rico. He is credited with the creation of the Ponce Creole architectural style, even though he was trained as an engineer, not a designer.

== Early years ==
Blas Cornelio Silva Boucher was born in Hormigueros, Puerto Rico on 2 February 1869.

== Schooling ==
Silva received his high school diploma from the Liceo de Mayaguez (Mayaguez Liceum) and then studied engineering in Spain through a scholarship from the Sociedad Protectora de la Inteligencia (Intelligence Protection Society). In Madrid, Silva did freelance school work in road, drainage, and ports engineering. He then entered the prestigious Spanish National Engineering School where he studied for eight years. He did his practicums in Aragon, Catalonia and Valencia, Spain.

== Professional life ==
He returned to the Island where he took an engineering position in the Puerto Rico Public Works Bureau. Three years later, he resigned to establish his own private engineering practice. When the post of City Engineer became vacant in the city of Ponce, Silva was unanimously selected, from among various applicants, as the candidate to fill the position.

== Death and legacy ==
Silva died in San Juan on 27 January 1949. Among Silva's most distinguished works are the Font-Ubides House (1913) and the Subira Residence (1910), both listed in the National Register of Historic Places. He also designed and built the Salazar-Candal House (1919).

== Honors ==
He is honored at Ponce's Park of the Illustrious Ponce Citizens. Ponce's best-known bridge, Puente de los Leones, located over Río Portugués on PR-1/Bulevar Miguel Pou at Calle Lolita Tizol, was named "Puente Blas Silva" before it was renamed Puente de Los Leones.

== Contemporary recognition ==
The Puerto Rico Historical Preservation Office recently said of him, "Blas Silva was probably the most established of the 'wedding-cake architects' and was thus sought after mostly by the 'nouveau riche' of the period. Silva's houses are among the richest in Ponce, among which the [Font-Ubides] stands out for its circular porches." It added that "Silva, as had other foreign-trained architects, succeeded in integrating classical education with the traditional elements of the Spanish Caribbean."

== See also ==
- Alfredo Wiechers
- Francisco Porrata Doria
