= Casa Salazar-Candal =

Historic house in Ponce, Puerto Rico

- Salazar–Candal House
- U.S. National Register of Historic Places
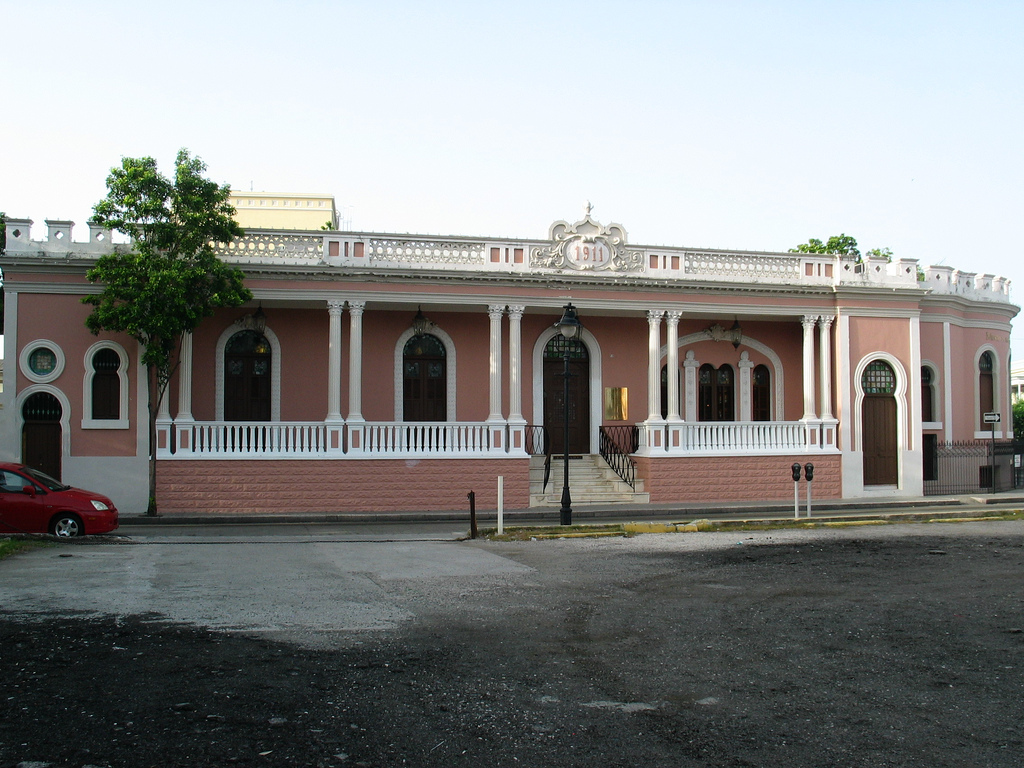
- The Historic 1911 Casa Salazar-Candal in Barrio Tercero

- Location within Puerto Rico
- Location: Calle Isabel 53, Ponce, Puerto Rico
- Coordinates: 18°00′45″N 66°36′42″W
- Area: < 1 acre
- Built: 1911
- Architect: Blas C. Silva
- Architectural style: Neoclassical, Art Nouveau, and Spanish Revival
- NRHP reference No.: 88000663
- Added to NRHP: June 9, 1988

Casa Salazar-Candal (English: Salazar–Candal House) is a historic building located on the southeast corner of Isabel and Mayor Cantera streets in Ponce, Puerto Rico, in the city's historic district. The building dates from 1911. It was designed by the architect Blas Silva. The architecture consists of 19th Classical revival, Art Nouveau and Spanish Revival architectural styles. Today the Salazar–Candal Residence houses the Museum of the History of Ponce.

== History ==
Casa Salazar was designed in 1911 by Blas Silva Boucher as the residence of Dr. Guillermo Salazar Palau and his wife Sara Isabel Rivera Carbonell. The house was a Guillermo Salazar Palua's wedding gift to his wife Sara Isabel. Later, it became the headquarters of the Alianza Nacionalista de Ponce (Ponce Nationalist Alliance) and later on yet, the headquarters for the Liga Progresista de Ponce (Ponce Progressive League), an organization seeking to preserve and advance the social, cultural, and commercial interest of the city during the first half of the twentieth century.

== Significance ==
Casa Salazar-Candal is one of a group of stylistically eclectic houses built in Ponce between 1900 and 1915. Designed by architect Blas C. Silva Bouscher in 1911, the building reflects an emerging tendency to incorporate freely diverse and competing architectural motifs. The facade is distinctly rendered in Roccoco and moorish detailing to emphasize its bifunctional character as a home and an office respectively. The portion of the structure designed to shelter the family is refined, delicately ornamented and asymmetrical. It utilizes a balcony, raised and detached from the street as a transitional zone between the public and the private sphere.

In contrast to the refinement and gentility of the house expressed by its fluted corinthian columns, floral surrounds and composite entablure, the office is fashioned as a moorish garrison exhibiting a crenelated parapet, horseshoe arches with simplified surrounds and planar surfaces. The building plane of the office is pushed forward to meet the sidewalk for public access in order to further express its utilitarian function.

Master craftsman Elias Concepcion has been credited with the execution of the interior finishes. His handling of the ornamental elements ranges from the curvilinear and stylized floral motifs present in the stained glass of the double doors, to the rectilinear wood screen—reminiscent of the Arts and Crafts movement – dividing the foyer from the living room. As with the exterior, the interior is a mixture of distinct stylistic elements. The vestibule's repousse sheet metal ornamentation reflects the roccoco treatment of the exterior, at once maintaining an image of opulence and refinement for the visitor while creating a transitional device for the predominantly planar interior surfaces. Many highstyle interiors of the beginning of the 20th century in the Ponce and Yauco region have been attributed to Elias Concepcion due to his sophisticated integration and subtle resolution of an eclectic vocabulary.

== Physical appearance and description ==
The house is located on a plot of land measuring 31 meters (on Isabel Street), by 13 meters (on Mayor Street), to the South 45 meters and to the East 22 meters. It was built in 1911 in reinforced concrete, brick and stone, and its roof was partly built in concrete and partly in timber with corrugated iron sheets.

The house is L-shaped in plan and consists of a main body where the public spaces and bedrooms are located. An extension, known commonly as the "martillo", completes the "L" shape and is where the kitchen and service quarters are located.

The facade employs classical elements mixed with moorish influenced details It is divided in three main sections; an ample balcony that corresponds to the family dwelling flanked by two enclosed spaces used formerly as the medical offices of the original owners. Access to this commercial space is directly from the street. The main doors are of a particular design in using the lobulated arch as a motif. These doors have stained glass panels in the Art Nouveau style. The residence balcony is raised over a rusticated-stone plinth. It is divided into four bays by the use of five paired and fluted corinthian columns. An Italian-influenced balustrade serves as the balcony railing. A cornice, neoclassical in style, runs the whole of the house's facade as well as the crenelated parapet over the office space. The staircase leading to the 'piano nobile' of the house is enhanced and accentuated in the parapet by an elaborated 'cartouche' indicating the date of construction of the house.

From the street, through the staircase and the main entrance, a foyer leads to an interior courtyard from which all the spaces of the house are distributed. Special features of the interior are the stained glass panels in the living room, showing a strong moorish influence in its form (lobulated arches) and its colour. The doors have louvered panels and stained glass insets. The living room, the studio and the bedrooms have pressed tin ceilings.

== See also ==
- Museo de la Historia de Ponce
