= Jaime Benítez Rexach =

Puerto Rican politician

Jaime Benítez
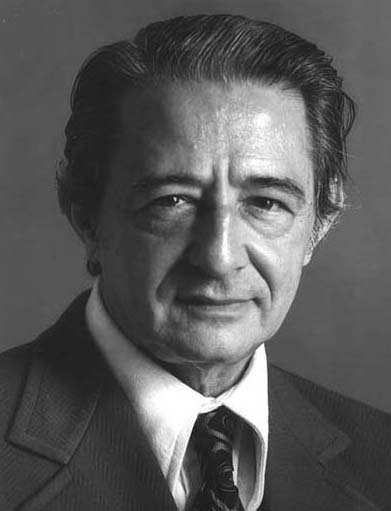

Resident Commissioner of Puerto Rico
- In office January 3, 1973 – January 3, 1977
- Preceded by: Jorge Luis Córdova
- Succeeded by: Baltasar Corrada del Río

President of the University of Puerto Rico
- In office 1966–1970
- Preceded by: Position established
- Succeeded by: Amador Cobas

Personal details
- Born: Jaime Benítez Rexach; October 29, 1908 Vieques, Puerto Rico
- Died: May 30, 2001 (aged 92) San Juan, Puerto Rico
- Resting place: Santa Maria Magdalena de Pazzis Cemetery
- Party: Popular Democratic
- Other political affiliations: Democratic
- Spouse: Lulu Martínez
- Children: 3; including Margarita
- Education: University of Chicago (MA); Georgetown University (LLB, LLM)

Jaime Benítez Rexach (October 29, 1908 – May 30, 2001) was a Puerto Rican author, academic and politician. He was the longest serving chancellor and the first president of the University of Puerto Rico. From 1973 to 1977, he served two terms in Congress as the Resident Commissioner of Puerto Rico.

== Early life ==
Jaime Benítez Rexach was born on Vieques, a small island about twenty miles off the shore of mainland Puerto Rico, to Luis Benítez and Candida Rexach. Among his ancestors were the noted Puerto Rican poets María Bibiana Benítez, Alejandrina Benítez de Gautier, and José Gautier Benítez. His mother died when he was seven years old, and his father died a year later. It fell to his older sister, who lived in San Juan, to raise him and his siblings. Benítez attended local public schools. In 1926 he left the island to attend Georgetown University in Washington, D.C., where he received an LL.B. degree in 1930 and an LL.M. in 1931. That same year he passed the District of Columbia bar examination and returned to Puerto Rico. He earned an M.A. at the University of Chicago in 1938.

== Career ==
In 1931 Benítez began a career in education at the University of Puerto Rico that spanned four decades: he was associate professor of social and political sciences (1931–1942), chancellor of its main campus in Río Piedras (1942–1966) for nearly 30 years. In 1948, during his tenure as chancellor, the university's pro-independence student body invited nationalist leader Pedro Albizu Campos to the Río Piedras campus as a guest speaker. Benítez did not permit Albizu access to the campus. As a result, the students protested and went on strike. The university was temporarily shut down and the leaders of the strike expelled from the university. As chancellor, Benítez also attracted many distinguished scholars and artists who had left Spain after its civil war, including Nobel Prize-winning poet Juan Ramón Jiménez and Catalan cellist Pablo Casals. In 1966, Benítez became the first president of the university, position in which he served until 1971. When Benítez began teaching, the university had five thousand students; by the time he left, the number of students at the university increased to forty thousand under his leadership.

Benítez published numerous articles, essays, and books. He was the author of a number of books that concern the university system, or the "house of studies" (casa de estudios) as he referred to it, including Junto a la Torre—Jornadas de un programa universitario (1963); Ética y estilo de la universidad (1964); La universidad del futuro (1964); and Sobre el futuro cultural y político de Puerto Rico (1965). From 1956 to 1971 he was the director and a contributor to La Torre, the University of Puerto Rico literary review. He maintained an active role in numerous national and international organizations: he was a member of the United States National Commission for the United Nations Educational, Scientific, and Cultural Organization (UNESCO) from 1948 to 1954, and attended the UNESCO conventions in Paris, France (1950) and Havana, Cuba (1952); he was a member of the Constitutional Convention of Puerto Rico, for which he was drafted while attending a UNESCO meeting, and the chairman of the Drafting Committee on the Bill of Rights from 1951 to 1952. In 1956, he was elected a Fellow of the American Academy of Arts and Sciences. He served as president of the National Association of State Universities from 1957 to 1958.

A close associate of the political leader Luis Muñoz Marín, who became Puerto Rico's first elected governor in 1949 and helped achieve a locally drafted Constitution in 1952, Benítez was part of the Constitutional Convention and collaborated in the drafting of the Bill of Human Rights included in the new Constitution, which recognized citizens' social and economic rights as well as their human rights, as well as the initial draft of the Constitution's Preamble. The two fell out in 1957, however, when Muñoz declared his "loss of confidence" in Benítez and accused him of using his university position to build a rival political movement to his own Popular Democratic Party, or PDP. Benítez won a vote of confidence in the Council on Higher Education by one vote. They were publicly reconciled before the 1960 elections, although the relationship remained rocky throughout the 1960s.

In 1966, the university statutes were changed again to permit greater political activity on the campus and Benítez was effectively kicked upstairs to the new and less powerful post of university president, which he gave up in 1971 due to political pressures under the first non-PDP administration since the 1930s.

=== U.S. Congress ===
In 1972, he was elected Resident Commissioner of Puerto Rico for a four-year term. In the U.S. House of Representatives he was assigned to the Committee on Education and Labor, an important committee assignment for a man who cared deeply about education and who had an interest in social and labor conditions in Puerto Rico. In the 94th Congress, Benítez introduced legislation to extend the Higher Education Act of 1965 to Puerto Rico. He showed interest in the affairs of U.S. territories, sponsoring legislation to allow American Samoa to elect a governor and lieutenant governor, and supporting the authorization of a loan to the Virgin Islands Government.

While in Congress he was a strong advocate of the current status of Puerto Rico, which he felt was preferable to statehood or independence. A bill to enhance Puerto Rico's relationship with the U.S., H.R. 11200, died in committee.

=== After Congress ===
After an unsuccessful reelection bid, Benítez returned to Puerto Rico. He taught at the Inter-American University of Puerto Rico (IAU) from 1980 to 1986. He was a professor of government at the American College in Bayamón, Puerto Rico.

== Legacy ==
Following his death, in 2002 the Interamerican University of Puerto Rico's Metro campus, where Benítez taught between 1980 and 1986 and of which he was a Distinguished Professor for the first two years, published a compilation of his speeches under the title of Discursos (Speeches).

On September 8, 2008, the IAU unveiled the publication of a biography of Benítez, edited by former San Juan mayor Héctor Luis Acevedo, at a ceremony hosted by Senate of Puerto Rico president Kenneth McClintock at the Puerto Rico Capitol Building, with Benítez's daughter, Margarita Benítez, in attendance. The activity was followed by the opening of an exhibition of photographs of Benítez, open to all Capitol visitors.

The University of Puerto Rico honored him with a series of commemorative acts commencing on the one hundred anniversary of his birth, October 29, 2008, with a series of conferences lasting for three days.

The road connecting the front gates of the Río Piedras campus to Highway 1, known as University Avenue, was renamed Paseo Jaime Benítez. Additionally, the main amphitheater of the Medical Sciences campus was named after Benítez.

In 2008, the Jaime Benítez National Park, at the easternmost part of the Condado Lagoon, was inaugurated in the presence of the then-governor Aníbal Acevedo Vilá and his wife Luisa Gándara who both arrived by kayak and sporting PPD-red-colored swimwear. The project was developed by the Puerto Rico National Parks Company and the governor took the opportunity to attack his opponent, and eventual successor, Luis Fortuño for his financial dealings as then-resident commissioner, a post previously held by Benítez under the PPD.

The new General Studies building at the Río Piedras campus was named after Benítez in 2009.

On March 3, 2010, the former Secretary of Health, Dr. Enrique Vázquez Quintana, offered a conference at the Luis Muñoz Marín Foundation, reviewing Benítez's trajectory as chancellor, his involvement in the creation of the Medical Sciences campus and the effect this had on the island's public health.

== Death ==
He died on May 30, 2001. He was survived by his wife, Luz "Lulu" Martínez de Benítez (née Martínez Martínez); two daughters, Clotilde and Margarita, and a son, Jaime. Upon his death a law was passed to give his widow a life pension of $20,000, which she received until her own death on July 5, 2005. Jaime Benítez Rexach was interred at Santa Maria Magdalena de Pazzis Cemetery in San Juan, Puerto Rico. Since Benítez had been crucial in creating the Medical Sciences campus, the Society of Graduate Doctors of the UPR, on the occasion of the centenary of his birth, donated $20,000 for a mausoleum designed by Javier Toro, to be built on his tomb. The mausoleum would an inscription containing "the last two lines of the Hymn to the Alma Mater or Hymn to Life composed by Francisco Arriví and Augusto Rodríguez in 1938: "To Jaime Benítez: glory to the fighter, honor to the University."

== Fundación Jaime Benítez-Rexach ==
The Fundación Jaime Benítez-Rexach de la Universidad de Puerto Rico en Arecibo (FJBR) is a non-profit organization and grant-making body formed in 2001 in memory of Jaime Benítez Rexach, who had died some months prior. Based in the University of Puerto Rico at Arecibo, the primary goals of the foundation are to "collaborate in satisfying the socio-cultural, educational and economic needs of the institution."

== See also ==
- List of Puerto Ricans
- Benitez's tree frog (Hypsiboas benitezi), a species of frog named in honor of Jaime Benítez Rexach
- List of Hispanic Americans in the United States Congress

Academic offices
New office	President of the University of Puerto Rico; 1966–1970	Succeeded by Amador Cobas
U.S. House of Representatives
Preceded by Jorge Luis Córdova	Resident Commissioner of Puerto Rico; 1973–1977	Succeeded by Baltasar Corrada del Río
