= Fuerte de San José =

Spanish fortress located in Ponce, Puerto Rico

- Barrio Playa; Near Ponce in Puerto Rico

Site information
- Type: Spanish fort
- Owner: Spanish Crown
- Operator: Spanish military in Puerto Rico
- Controlled by: Batallón Cazadores "La Patria" Nº 25

Location
- Coordinates: 17.9806°N 66.62173°W

Site history
- Built: 1758 to 1760
- Built by: Spanish Royal Corps of Engineers
- In use: 1760 to 20 March 1885
- Materials: Masonry
- Fate: Demolished in 1907

Garrison information
- Past commanders: Sgt Rafael Muñoz (1836); Col. Tomas de Renovales (1836); Capt Gen. Miguel de la Torre (1836)
- Designations: 7-cannon battery
- Demolished to make room for growing civilian urbanization of the area

Fuerte de San José, also known as Fuerte de la Playa de Ponce, (Note: Socorro Girón calls it Fuerte Alfonso XII. See Ponce, El teatro La Perla y La Campana de la Almudaina, p. 439.) was an 18th-19th-century Spanish fortress located in Barrio Playa in the municipality of Ponce, Puerto Rico. It was part of a three-fort system design to defend the Port of Ponce, the Barrio Playa seaport village and the City of Ponce from seaborne attacks. However, only two of the three fortifications materialized, with Fuerte San José being the largest and most complete. The fort was in operation for 125 years, from 1760 to 20 March 1885, and was demolished in 1907 by order of the Puerto Rico Legislature to make room for the growing civilian population of Barrio Playa. Fuerte de San José has been compared to Fortín de San Gerónimo in San Juan, in terms of design, purpose and size.

== History ==
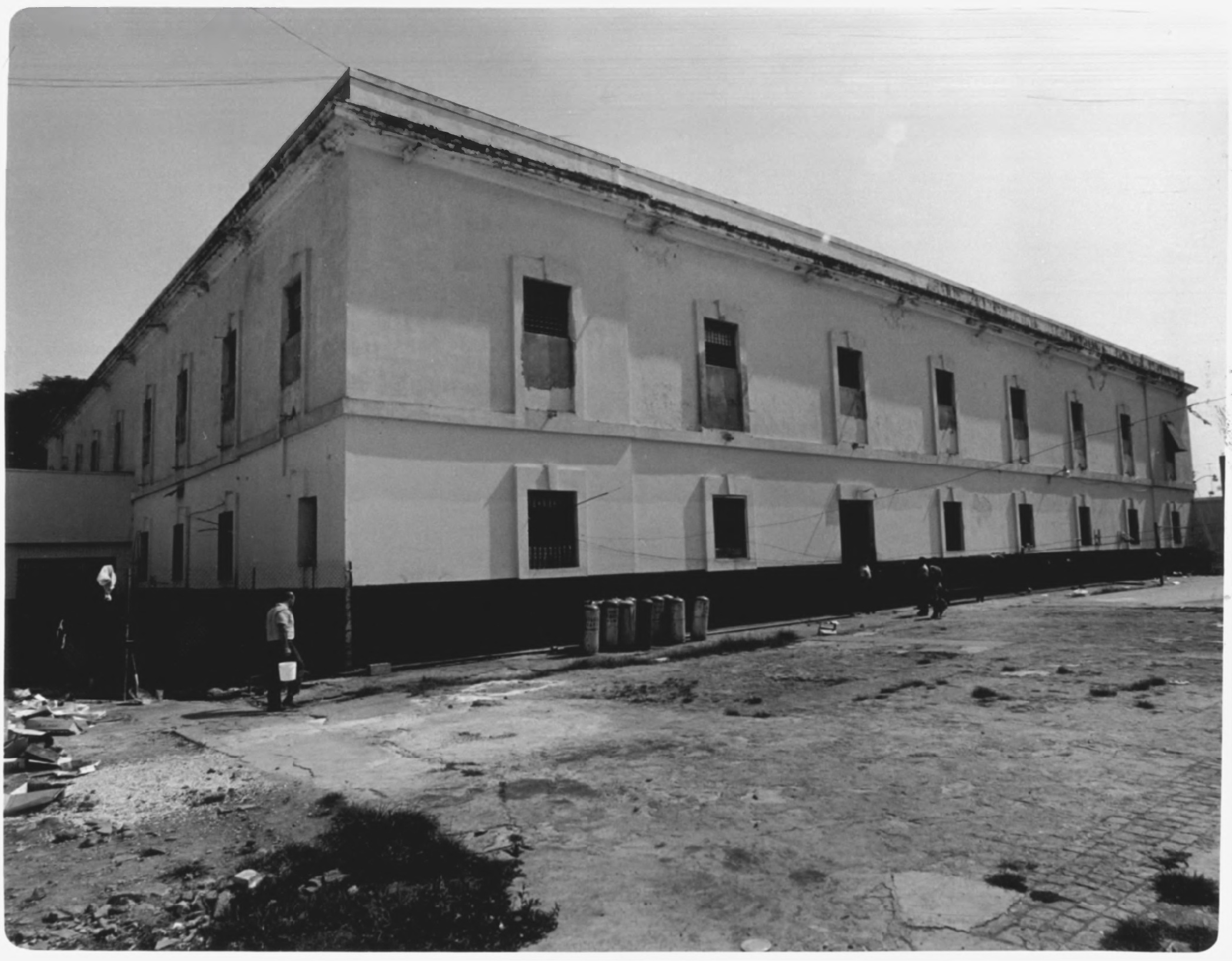
Spanish Military headquarters in Ponce, completed 1894

=== Main fort ===
Fuerte de San José was one of a three-fort defense system designed by the Spanish military for the defense of the Port of Ponce, (Note: During the lifetime of Fuerte de San José, namely during the years 1760 to 1907, the Port of Ponce was located at the southern terminus of Camino Real, aka, Camino de la Marina, which is today's Avenida Hostos. That location was about one mile west of the current (2019) location of Port of Ponce on Punta Peñoncillo. In 1911 the U.S. Federal Government granted the City of Ponce a perpetual franchise to operate the Port. During the second decade of the 20th century (1910s), a new harbor was built. (See La Vuelta de la Feria: Segunda Parte del Juguete Cómico "Los Jíbaros Progresistas o La Feria de Ponce", Original y en Verso." Ramon Mendez Quiñones. Tipografía "El Vapor". Ponce, Puerto Rico. 28 July 1882. Archivo Digital Nacional de Puerto Rico. p. 244 (footnote). Accessed 5 April 2019.) The new Port of Ponce was built on Punta Peñoncillo, where it currently (2019) stands.) Barrio Playa, and the City of Ponce. The fort took two years to build and was completed in 1760. The Spaniards later built barracks 2 miles inland, in the city of Ponce proper, for the defense of the city, called "El Castillo" capable of housing 700 men, but a proper defense system was needed for the port and Barrio Playa areas to protect them from seaborne attacks that could also reach the city.

The three forts were to be located (traveling west to east) at Punta Cucharas (Barrio Canas), Barrio Playa, and Punta Gatas (also in Barrio Playa). Fuerte de San José was the defense structure which, after completion of the other two planned fortifications, would sit about halfway between the two, in Barrio Playa. The fort was staffed by the Batallón De Cazadores "La Patria" Nº 25.

=== The two other forts ===
A second battery was built, at El Peñoncillo, (Note: El Peñoncillo was also known as Punta Peñoncillo. It was a shore area located about a mile east of Fuerte San José, and is where Port of Ponce is currently (2019) located. See, Eduardo Neumann Gandia, Verdadera y Autentica Historia de la Ciudad de Ponce, 1913, p. 259; Mariano Vidal Armstrong, Ponce: Notas para su Historia, 1986, p. 22; Eli D. Oquendo Rodriguez, De Criadero a Partido, 2015, p. 101.; Luis A. Irizarry Perez. Mi Vida. Published in Ponce, Puerto Rico. 2011. Printed in Colombia by Nomos Impresores. p. 201. ISBN 9781935892120) and staffed by 40–50 men. This second fort at El Peñoncillo was completed in 1802. However, Fuerte San José was the main fort built to defend the shores of Ponce from the frequent attacks by pirates and nations who were enemies of Spain. A third fort was designed to be located at Punta Cucharas; however, it was never built. On 8 October 1823, 53 years after the construction of Fuerte San Jose and 21 years after the construction of the second battery at El Peñoncillo, the Ponce Municipal Assembly discussed plans and established budgeting rules for the financing of the third battery. This third battery, however, was never built.

== Location and description ==
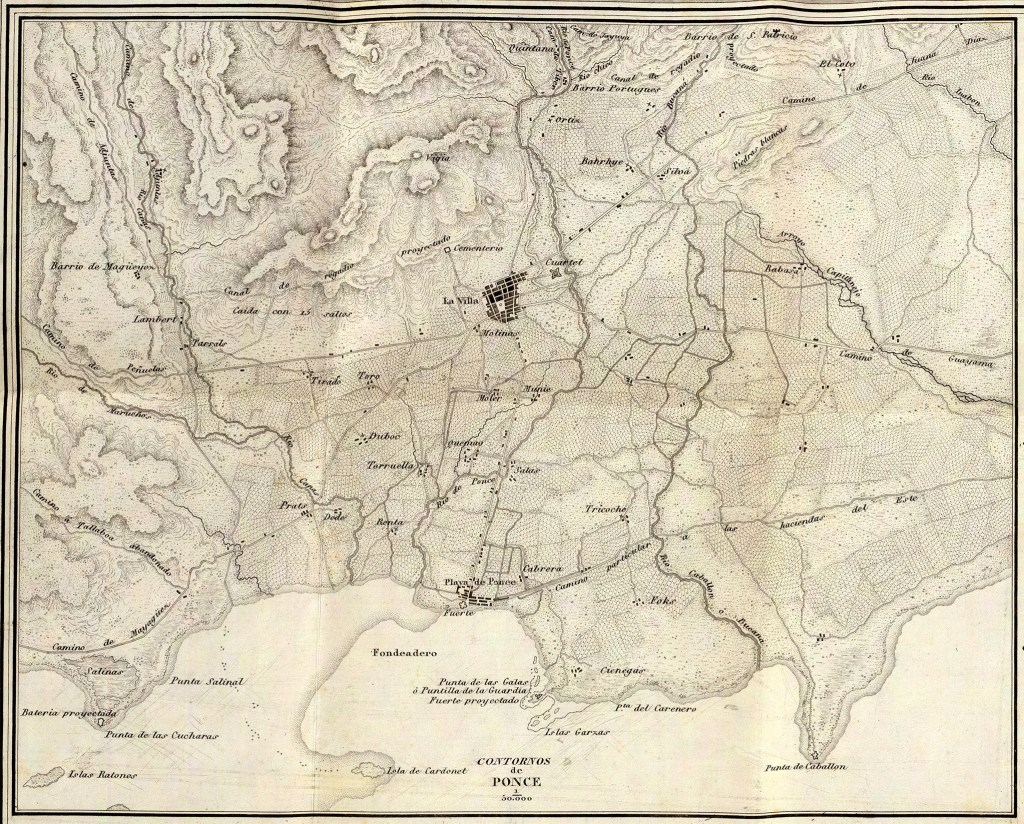
1851 map of Port of Ponce showing location of the sea-front Fuerte de San José and the two additional support fortifications

Structure of an 1800s cannon like the ones used at Fuerte de San José

The fort faced the Caribbean Sea, contained seven cannons mounted on a battery, and was staffed by artillery and infantry personnel. By 1775, but possibly for many years earlier as well, the Spanish had a cannon de a seis (a 6-caliber cannon) in Ponce, in the city proper, for the defense of the city. Since there was a three-mile distance from the city to the port, the port was vulnerable to attacks without the availability of a quick response from city artillery. Thus the port needed its own defense equipment. It was out of this need that Fuerte de San José was built.

The Fuerte de San José structure was built in masonry, with housing quarters and supplies storage also in masonry. It provided a base defense structure and, to complement it, two other defense structures were planned. Fuerte de San José was located between the Caribbean Sea and the village of La Playa and just west of the port facilities. The second structure, a battery, was built in 1801 at El Peñoncillo (Punta Peñoncillo), a location east of the port. A third structure, consisting of only a battery, was planned for Punta Cucharas, but was never built. The battery at El Peñoncillo was built and completed by José Benítez. This battery was donated to the people of Ponce by its teniente a guerra. (Note: A teniente a guerra was a combination "military commandant/civil superintendent" that the Spanish Crown, via its Colonial Governor in Puerto Rico, planted in each district to oversee a region of the governed territory. See "Puerto Rican Poetry: A Selection from Aboriginal to Contemporary Times." by Robert Márquez. University of Massachusetts Press. 2007. ISBN 9781558495623 p.55.) José Benítez built it "from his own money" and the battery was later accepted by the Spanish Crown as part of the Spanish arsenal in Ponce. Benitez's battery was 24.5 varas wide (about 75 feet) and "of the necessary height to make a secure and solid edification". It had four doors, two at each side, two 6-caliber cannons, and all the necessary supplies to mount a defense. It possessed enough supplies to support 50 men for thirteen days, as well as support personnel such as blacksmiths and carpenters. The structure's initial stock contained gunpowder, bullets, rifles, and crowbars. José Benítez's position in Ponce was that of a teniente a guerra, a combination "military commandant/civil superintendent".

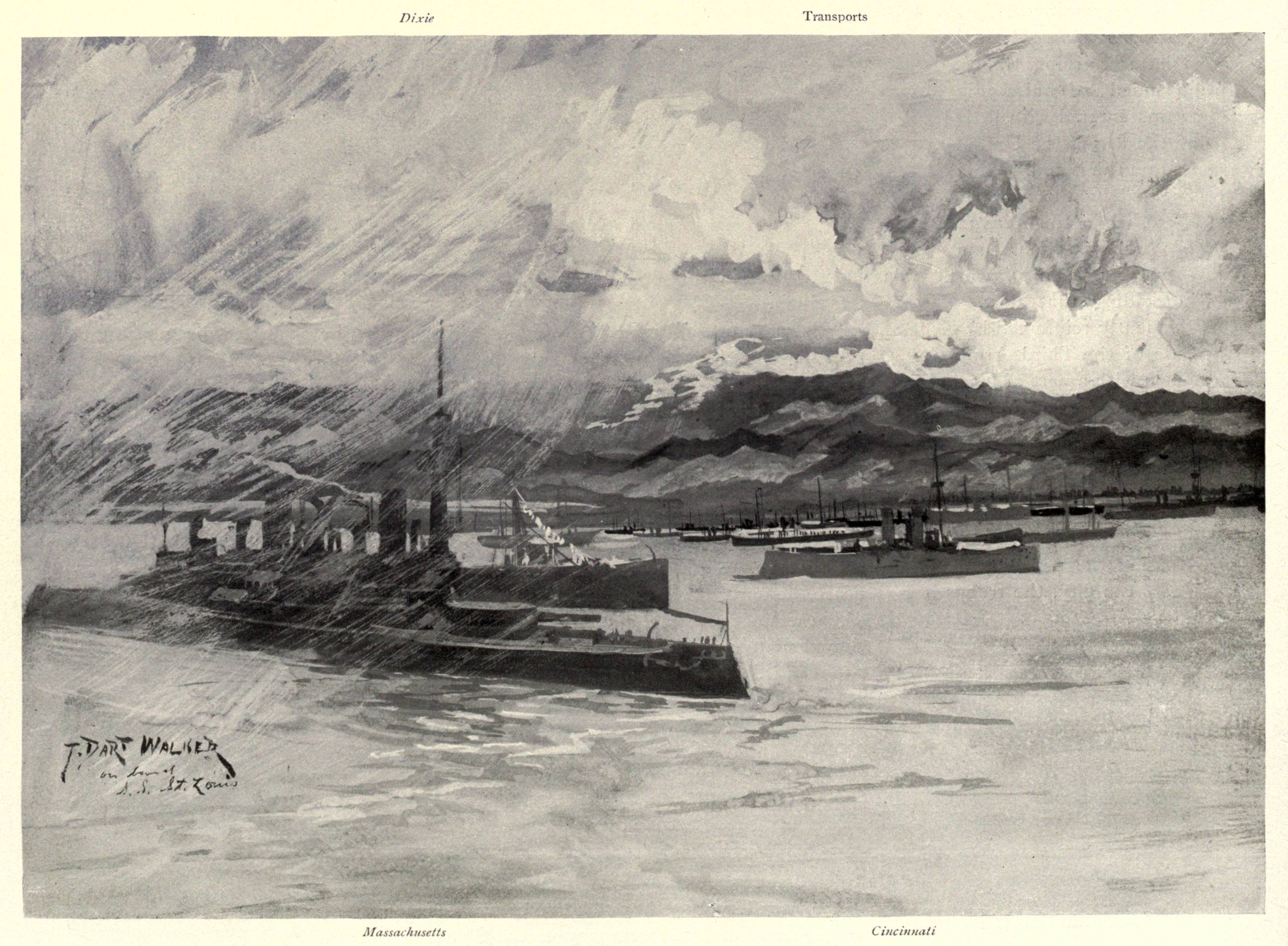
US troopships and convoy at Playa de Ponce, 1898

== Later years ==
On 20 March 1885, the Spanish governor in Puerto Rico, Luis Daban, informed the Spanish military commander in Ponce he had decided to withdraw the military located at the fort on a permanent basis and ordered the transfer of any pieces of artillery and ammunition stored there to San Juan, effectively decommissioning Fuerte de San José as a fortress. During the next few years, and as it deteriorated for lack of repair, it received some use by the local Ponce municipal guard that served Barrio Playa. It was still standing, but nonoperational, at the time of the American invasion of Puerto Rico in 1898, and was demolished in 1907 by order of the Puerto Rico Legislature in order to enlarge Calle Alfonso XII and make room for civilian population growth in that area.

The location of Fuerte San José is today occupied by Plaza 65 de Infantería, a small, passive, family-oriented plaza from where the Caribbean Sea can be observed. The location of the battery at El Peñoncillo is today (2019) the entrance to the dike-supported roadway that leads from mainland Puerto Rico to Club Náutico de Ponce on Isla Gatas, and the location for the third battery that was never built is today the protected area of Reserva Natural Punta Cucharas. No traces of any of the fortifications remain today (2019).

== Historical timeline ==
- 1673 – Attacked by the French, killing Juan de Aliseda and taking Juan Silverio prisoner, both watchmen at the Ponce port. A group of 14 militiamen from Ponce then counterattacked, killing all the French invaders.
- 1702 – Attacked by the Dutch via Guayanilla, leaving 38 Dutch death. (Note: Mariano Vidal Armstrong states that this event occurred in 1802. See Vidal Armstrong's Ponce, Notas para su Historia, Second edition, 1986, p. 21.)
- 1704 – An attack by 80 men in three English vessels is thwarted. (Note: Fernando Picó states the English attacked in December 1804. See "Ponce y los rostros rayados: sociedad y esclavitud, 1800-1830." San Juan, Puerto Rico: Ediciones Huracán. 2012. p. 16. ISBN 1932913149)
- 1734 – On 13 July, a Corsican ship owned by Luis Perez engages in a fight with pirate ships at the port of Ponce leaving several dead.
- 1742 – On 22 November, several civilians residents of Ponce perish at the hands of English pirates attempting to appropriate a shipment of merchandise belonging to a damaged merchant ship that had made a stop-over for repairs at the Port of Ponce.
- 1743 – An English schooner disembarks at Playa Bocachica but was repelled by a group of local residents.
- 1758 – On 16 December, a small group of military men from Ponce captured two sloops with contraband.
- 1760 – Fuerte de San José is built.
- 1794 – An artillery battery is built at El Peñoncillo.
- 1797:
  - The Capitania del Puerto is established.
  - Two companies totaling 202 men go to San Juan to aid in the defense of the city from the Drake's British attack.
- 1800 – In August, a fleet of British warships attempts to capture the shore settlement but is repelled by the Municipal Guard and Ponce militia.
- 1801 – In October, a fleet of British warships re-attempts capture of the shore settlement but is again repelled by the Ponce Municipal Guard and Ponce militia.
- 1802 – An artillery battery, donated by José Benítez is installed at El Peñoncillo.
- 1825 – Caribbean Sea pirate Roberto Cofresí, a Puerto Rican, is jailed and later executed in San Juan by Spanish authorities.
- 1835 – On 13 August, Hurricane San Hipolito destroyed a fair portion of the sleeping quarters as well as the fort's foundation and two sentry boxes.
- 1887 – Caja de Muertos lighthouse lit
- 1889 – Isla Cardona lighthouse lit
- 1898 – On 28 July, U.S. General Miles enters Ponce proclaiming liberty and Puerto Rico becomes a U.S. possession
- 1907 – Fort is demolished by order of the U.S.-appointed colonial Legislature of Puerto Rico to make room for urbanizing the area for civilian use
- 1956 – The location where the fort was located, now a plaza, is renamed "Plaza 65 de Infantería" by Resolution #56 of the Ponce Municipal Assembly

== See also ==
- Puerto Rico Campaign
- Military history of Puerto Rico
- Bahía de Ponce
- Fortín San Juan de la Cruz
- El Cañuelo
