= List of streets in Ponce, Puerto Rico =

External audio
- You may see some of the streets in Downtown Ponce HERE

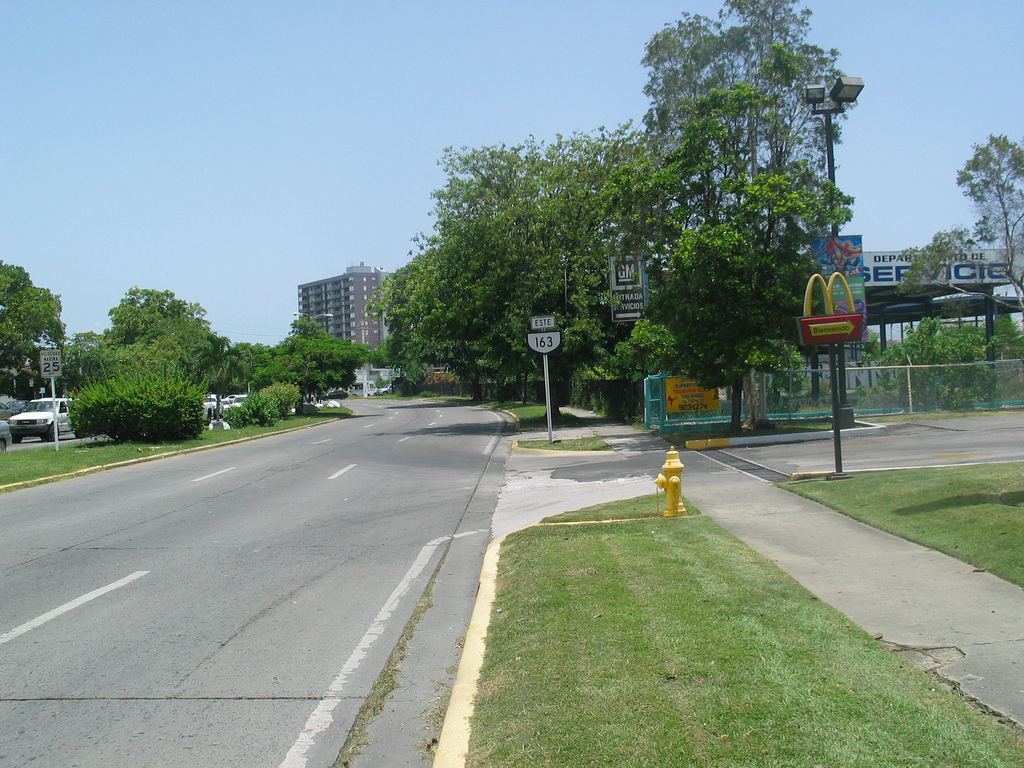
Avenida Las Américas (PR-163), looking east

This article provides a listing, with brief descriptions, of the most traveled or best known streets and thoroughfares in Ponce, Puerto Rico. Unless otherwise noted, traffic is two-way. If traffic is two-way for the entire length of the street (as opposed to just a portion of its length), it is designated with the symbol "↔" under the column "Traffic direction"; otherwise, the dash symbol ("–") is used.

== List of streets ==
Name	Southern or western terminus	Northern or eastern terminus	Length, mi (km)	No. of lanes	Traffic direction	Notes	Photo
Avenida Fagot	Bulevar Miguel Pou	Puerto Rico Highway 10	3.0 (4.8) (Note: Estimated length)	4	S ↔ N	Southern terminus becomes Avenida Las Américas at Bulevar Miguel Pou	
Avenida Hostos (Note: Avenida Hostos was previously known as Camino Real. On 11 September 1903, it was renamed Avenida Eugenio María de Hostos.)	Plaza de Recreo de la Playa	Calle Ferrocarril	2.5 (4.0)	2	S ↔ N	—	
Avenida Las Américas	Puerto Rico Highway 500 (Puente San Antonio)	Bulevar Miguel Pou	3.0 (4.8)	6	W ↔ E	Northern terminus becomes Avenida Fagot at Bulevar Miguel Pou	
Avenida Muñoz Rivera	Puerto Rico Highway 2	Avenida Las Américas	0.5 (0.80)	2	S ↔ N	—	
Avenida Santiago de los Caballeros	Port of Ponce	Avenida Tito Castro	3.28 (5.28)	4–6	S ↔ N	Some segments are 4 lanes only	
Avenida Tito Castro	Puerto Rico Highway 12	Puerto Rico Highway 139	3.0 (4.8)	4	W ↔ E	Becomes Calle Betances at the bridge over Río Portugués, where it becomes a one-lane, westbound street	
Bulevar Miguel Pou	Parque del Tricentenario / Puente de los Leones	Avenida Ednita Nazario	1.5 (2.4)	4 (Note: Six (6) lanes when both frontage roads (or Calle Marginal) are considered.)	W ↔ E	Eastern end turns into Ponce Bypass.	
Calle Atocha	Calle Isabel	Calle Victoria	0.1 (0.16)	1	S – N	Traffic is one-way northbound.	
Calle Cantera (a.k.a. Calle Mayor Cantera)	Calle Marina	Puerto Rico Highway 10	0.5 (0.80)	2	N – S	Traffic is one-way southbound from Calle Tricoche (i.e., 1 block north of PR-14) to Calle Marina (i.e., PR-123)	
Calle Comercio	Plaza Las Delicias	Avenida Santiago de los Caballeros	1.2 (1.9)	1–2	W – E	Traffic is eastbound from Plaza Las Delicias to Calle Cruz	
Calle Isabel	Plaza Muñoz Rivera	Parque del Tricentenario	0.4 (0.64)	1–2	E – W	Except for the one block from Plaza Muñoz Rivera to Calle León, traffic is one-way westbound.	
Calle Marina	Calle Ferrocarril	Plaza Las Delicias	0.4 (0.64)	1–2	S – N	Traffic is northbound one-way north of Calle Mayor to Plaza Las Delicias; South of Calle Mayor traffic is two-way; Southern end becomes Avenida Hostos at Calle Ferrocarril	
Calle Villa	Bridge over Río Cañas at entrance to Urbanización Jardines del Caribe	Plaza Las Delicias	2.0 (3.2)	2	W – E	Traffic is eastbound one-way from Carretera Pámpanos to Plaza Las Delicias	
Calle 25 de Enero	Calle Villa	Residencial Santiago Iglesias	unknown	1	N – S	—	
Carretera Pámpanos	Puerto Rico Highway 2	Calle Villa	1.0 (1.6)	2	S ↔ N	—	
Ponce Bypass	Carretera Pámpanos	Avenida Ednita Nazario	4.0 (6.4)	6	W ↔ E	Eastern end becomes Bulevar Miguel Pou.	

== See also ==
- List of highways in Ponce, Puerto Rico
