= Margarita Benítez =

Puerto Rican educator and education policy expert

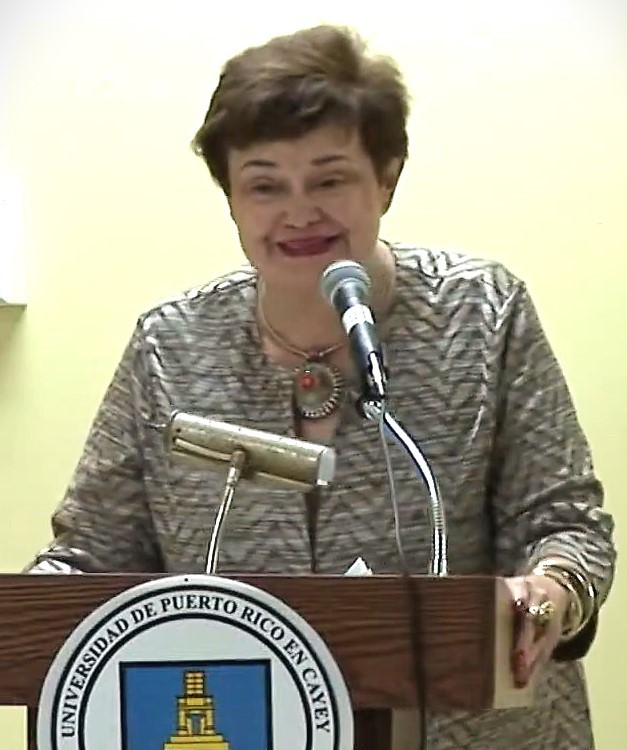
- Benítez, 2014
- Born: Margarita Inés Benítez Martínez; 1949 (age 76–77); San Juan, Puerto Rico
- Other name: Margarita Benítez Martínez
- Education: Vassar College (AB); Middlebury College (MA); Columbia University (Ph.D)
- Occupations: Educator and education policy expert
- Years active: 1977–2022
- Father: Jaime Benítez Rexach

Margarita Inés Benítez Martínez (born 1949) is a Puerto Rican educator and education policy expert. After completing a bachelor of arts degree at Vassar College, she earned a master's at Middlebury College and a PhD at Columbia University. She taught Spanish and literature classes at the University of Puerto Rico at Cayey in the 1970s. Moving into administration in the 1980s, she was rector and then president of UPR Cayey while simultaneously serving as the acting chancellor of the University of Puerto Rico at Humacao. In 1986, she founded the first women's studies program in Puerto Rico.

In 1998, Benítez moved to Washington, D.C. to work for the United States Department of Education and implement Title V, government funding designed to eliminate under-representation of Latinos in higher education. After six years, she moved to the Institute for Higher Education Policy and worked with other NGOs to improve access to higher education for Latino students and coordinate tertiary education activities for a network of universities. She co-founded the Women's Knowledge International project in 2011 and has since served as its co-director. The project aims to improve scholarship on women and their involvement in global peace initiatives. She returned to Puerto Rico in 2018 as the first woman to head the Fundación Puertorriqueña de las Humanidades (Puerto Rican Endowment for the Humanities). Under her leadership the organization created both an on-line encyclopedia of Puerto Rico and a digital cultural archive.

== Early life and education ==
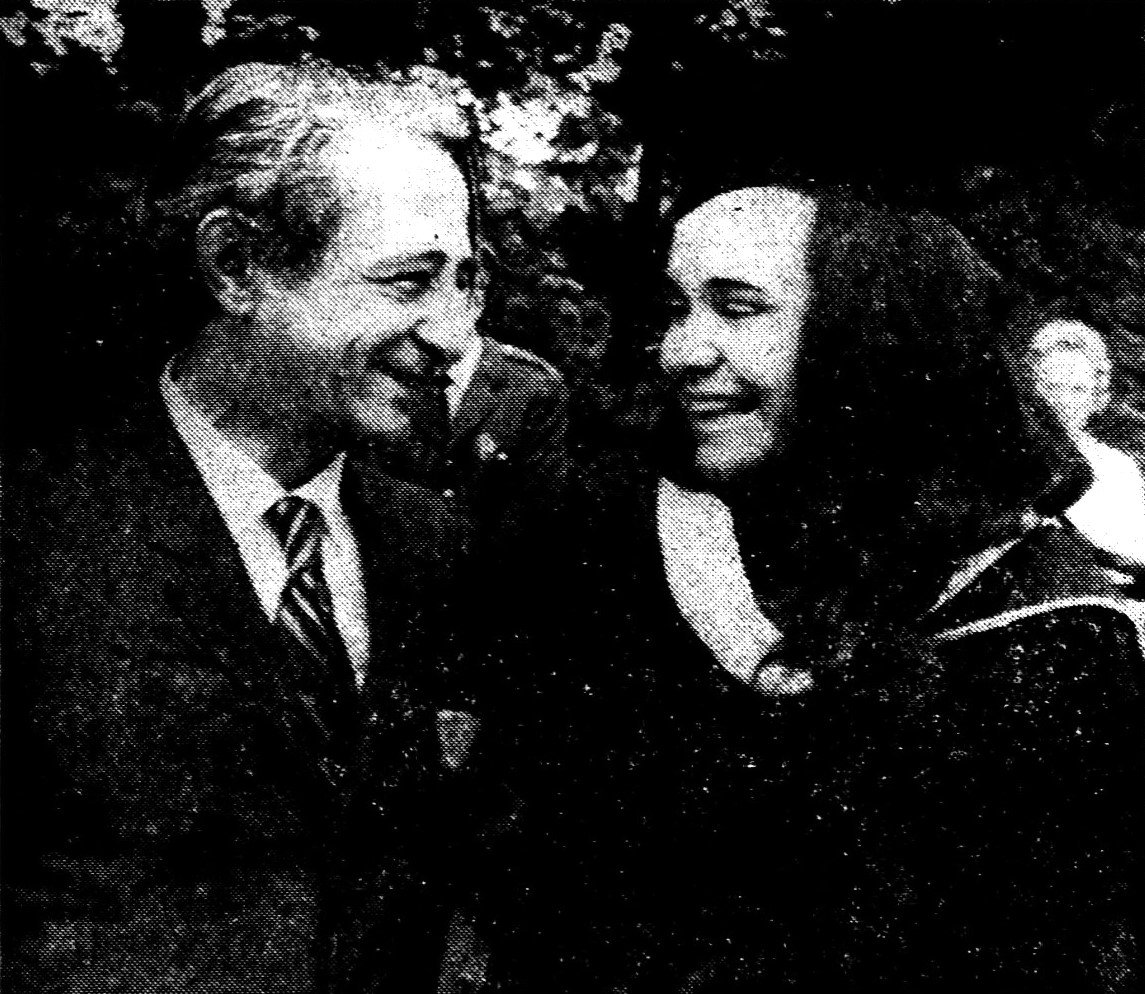
Benítez (right) with her father, Jaime Benítez Rexach, at her 1970 graduation from Vassar College

Margarita Inés Benítez Martínez was born in 1949 in the barrio Obrero district of San Juan, Puerto Rico, to Luz "Lulu" Martínez Martínez and Jaime Benítez Rexach. Her father was chancellor and president of the University of Puerto Rico, and involved in politics. He helped draft legislation for Puerto Rico's constitutional Bill of Human Rights and served as the commonwealth's representative for the island in the United States House of Representatives from 1972 to 1976. His three children, Clotilde, Margarita and Jaime, grew up in a home surrounded by intellectuals from many countries, who exposed them to many ideas. Her father instilled in them the transformative value of education as a means to build better understanding and improve the community. She attended the Escuela Elemental y Escuela Superior de la Universidad de Puerto Rico (Elementary School and High School of the University of Puerto Rico). While attending Vassar College she spent a year in Spain, studying Spanish literature and philosophy in Madrid. In 1970, she graduated with highest honors from Vassar College with a bachelor of arts degree. She continued her education, earning a master's degree in Spanish from Middlebury College in Vermont and a PhD in Spanish literature from Columbia University in Manhattan.

== Career ==
By the latter half of the 1970s, Benítez had returned home and was head of the Spanish department at the University of Puerto Rico at Cayey. By 1980, she was also leading the humanities department, and went on to become the rector and later president of the university. Active in feminist issues, in 1986 she introduced the first women's study program in Puerto Rico, Projecto Estudios de la Mujer (PRO-Mujer, Women's Studies Project). During this time frame, she became acting chancellor of the University of Puerto Rico at Humacao.

In 1998, Benítez moved to Washington, D.C. and was employed as a senior official in the Office of Postsecondary Education for the United States Department of Education. She was in charge of development for university programs serving minorities and implementation of Title V of the Higher Education Act. This section of the law deals with providing federal funding to tertiary institutions which meet specifications for eliminating the under-representation of Latinos in higher education. As a senior associate with the Institute for Higher Education Policy from 2004, she was responsible for the Building Engagement and Attainment for Minority Students project and the National Articulation and Transfer Network. Beginning in 2006, Benítez simultaneously worked as a research associate for the non-profit Excelencia in Education, developing policies to improve access to higher education for Latino students. She became the director of higher education at The Education Trust in 2007, coordinating tertiary education activities in twenty-three states.

Along with Teresa Langle de Paz, in 2011 Benítez co-founded and became co-director of Women's Knowledge International, a global project headquartered at the Culture of Peace Foundation at the Autonomous University of Madrid in Spain. The purpose of the organization is to promote scholarship on women and their involvement in peace initiatives throughout the world. In 2013, Benítez was selected as one of four fellows from throughout the United States of the Lumina Foundation. That year, she joined the American Council on Education as interim assistant vice-president overseeing their fellowship program. While away from Puerto Rico, Benítez taught at numerous universities in the United States, such as Columbia University, Fordham University, and the State University of New York at Albany , as well as in Spain.

In 2018, Benítez returned to Puerto Rico to head the Fundación Puertorriqueña de las Humanidades (FPH, Puerto Rican Endowment for the Humanities). She was the first woman to be appointed as head of the organization, which is dedicated to promoting knowledge and study about Puerto Rico. Under her leadership, the FPH launched the Enciclopedia PR (Online Encyclopedia of Puerto Rico) and the digital cultural archive, Cosecha Cultural. She served as director until 2022.
