= Puerto Rico Highway 12 =

Highway in Puerto Rico

Highway 12
- Ruta 12
- Avenida Santiago de los Caballeros

Route information
- Maintained by Puerto Rico DTPW
- Length: 6.4 km (4.0 mi)
- Existed: 1960 (Note: The segment south of the Ponce Bypass (PR-2) was built in 1960. The segment north of PR-2 was built in the 1990s, and completed in 2002.)–present

Major junctions
- South end: Port of Ponce in Playa
- PR-123 in Playa; Avenida Caribe in Playa; PR-52 in Playa; Avenida Rafael Cordero Santiago in Playa; PR-2 in San Antón; PR-163 in San Antón; PR-133 in San Antón; PR-1 in San Antón
- North end: PR-14 in Machuelo Abajo

Location
- Country: United States
- Territory: Puerto Rico
- Municipalities: Ponce

Highway system
- Roads in Puerto Rico; List
← PR-10	→ PR-14

Puerto Rico Highway 12 (PR-12), also called Avenida Malecón, and Avenida Santiago de los Caballeros, is a 6.4-kilometer, limited-access highway entirely located within the city limits of Ponce, Puerto Rico, and connecting Puerto Rico Highway 14 to the La Guancha area in Barrio Playa in Ponce. It is similar to a freeway but has one traffic light near its intersection with PR-14. In addition to its northern and southern terminus, the highway has four full interchange exits: PR-52, PR-2, PR-133/Calle Comercio, and Avenida Las Américas. Since PR-12's southern terminus is at the Port of Ponce, its traffic volume is expected to grow as construction in the new Port of the Americas is completed.

== Route description ==
With a length of about 6.4 kilometers (4.0 mi), PR-12 begins at PR-14 (Avenida Tito Castro) intersection in Barrio Machuelo Abajo. PR-12 also intersects with Calle Obispado in Machuelo Abajo. Then, PR-12 enters Barrio San Antón, where meets with PR-1 (Boulevard Miguel Pou), PR-133 (Calle Comercio) and PR-163 (Avenida Las Américas) interchanges, and crosses the Río Portugués. After the river, PR-12 has an interchange with PR-2 (Ponce Bypass) between San Antón and Playa. In Barrio Playa, PR-12 has interchanges with Avenida Rafael Cordero Santiago, PR-52 (Autopista Luis A. Ferré) and Avenida Caribe, with intersections with Calle Puerto Viejo and PR-123 just before its southern terminus at the Port of Ponce and La Guancha. Most of the route has three lanes per direction, except in the southern terminus, where there are two lanes in both directions.

== History ==
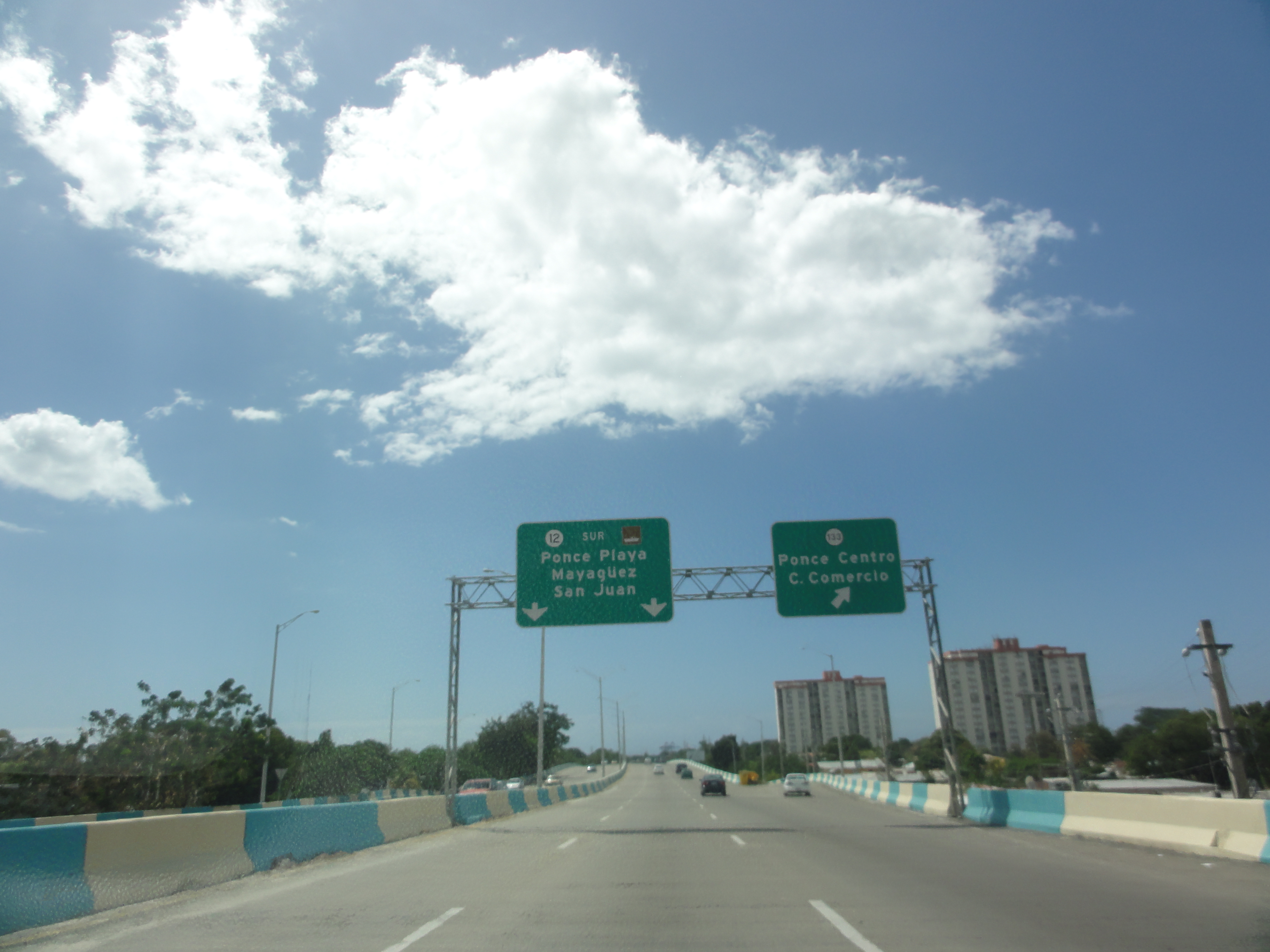
Southbound lanes of PR-12, near exit to PR-133 (Calle Comercio), in Ponce

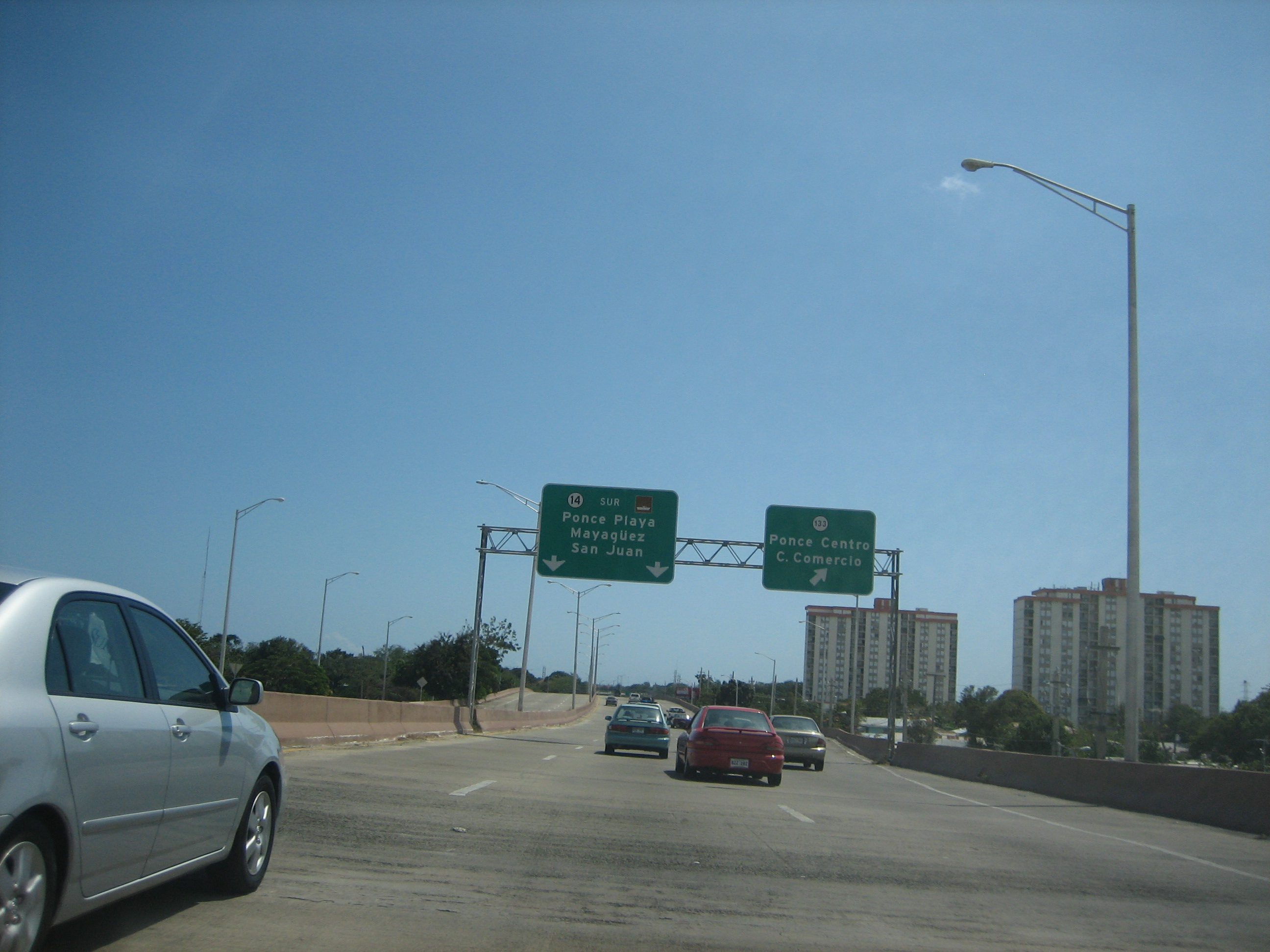
2008 PR-12 photo with old PR-14 signing

Detailed map of PR-12

The 2.5 kilometer section of this road, from the Ponce Bypass to just a few feet from the Caribbean Sea at PR-123, was the first segment built; it was built in 1960. It was called "Avenida Malecón" (Pier Avenue), as it led from the then-urbanized area of Ponce to the Ponce wharf. The segment north of PR-12's intersection with PR-2, that is, between PR-2 and Avenida Tito Castro was built in the 1990s, and completed in 2002, as part of the Ponce en Marcha project.

PR-12 used to be signed as part of 'PR-14' before construction of the new PR-10 took place. The PR-14 signing has since been moved into another route (ending at Monumento a la abolición de la esclavitud, near downtown Ponce, while the PR-12 signing was assigned to the southernmost 5.28 kilometers of the old PR-14 route. As of 2008, the Puerto Rico Department of Transportation and Public Works had not yet updated the signing on the road, but by 2011 it had.

== Major intersections ==
The entire route is located in Ponce. All exits are unnumbered.

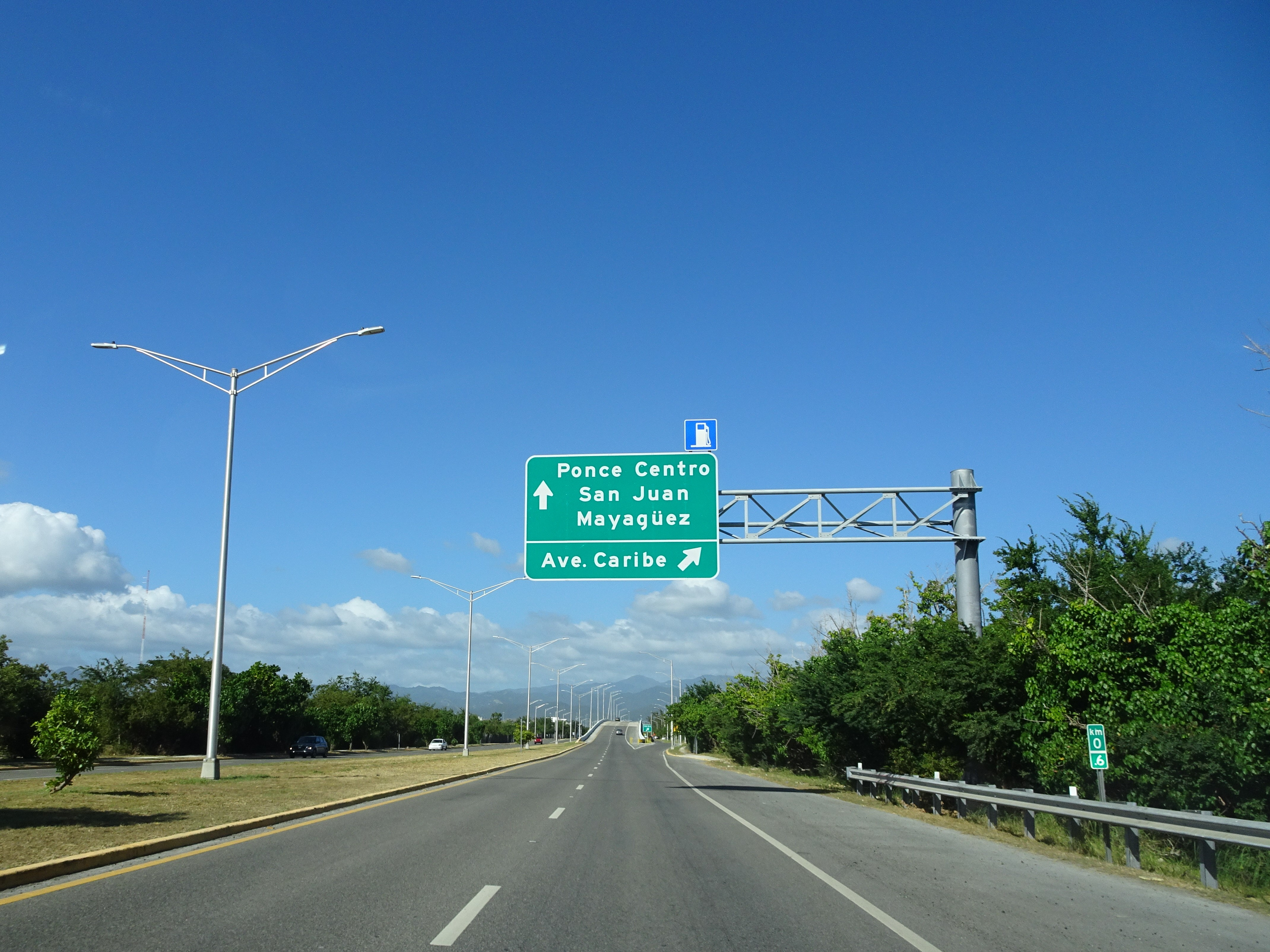
PR-12 north at its exit to Avenida Caribe

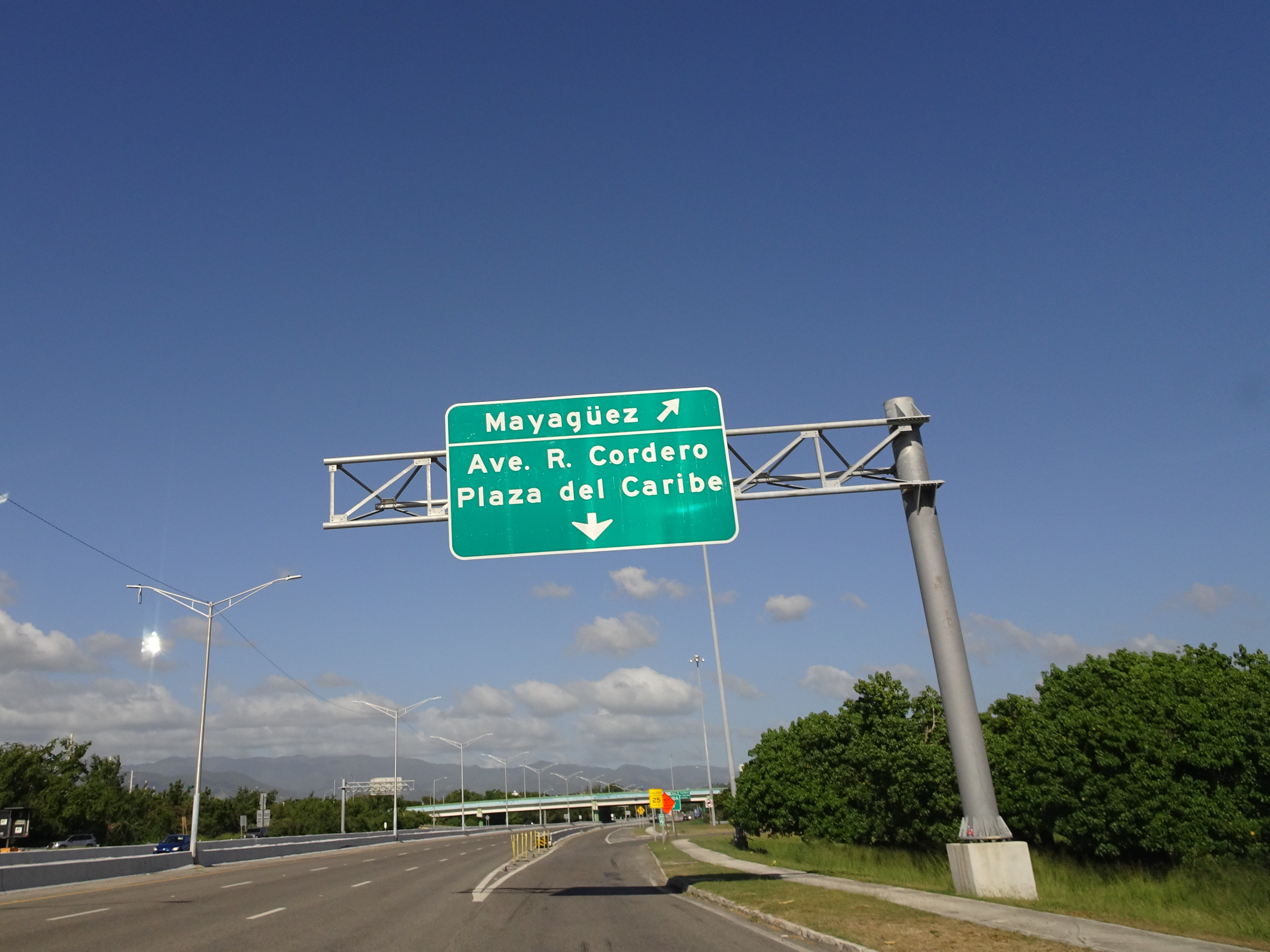
PR-12 north at its exit to Avenida Rafael Cordero Santiago

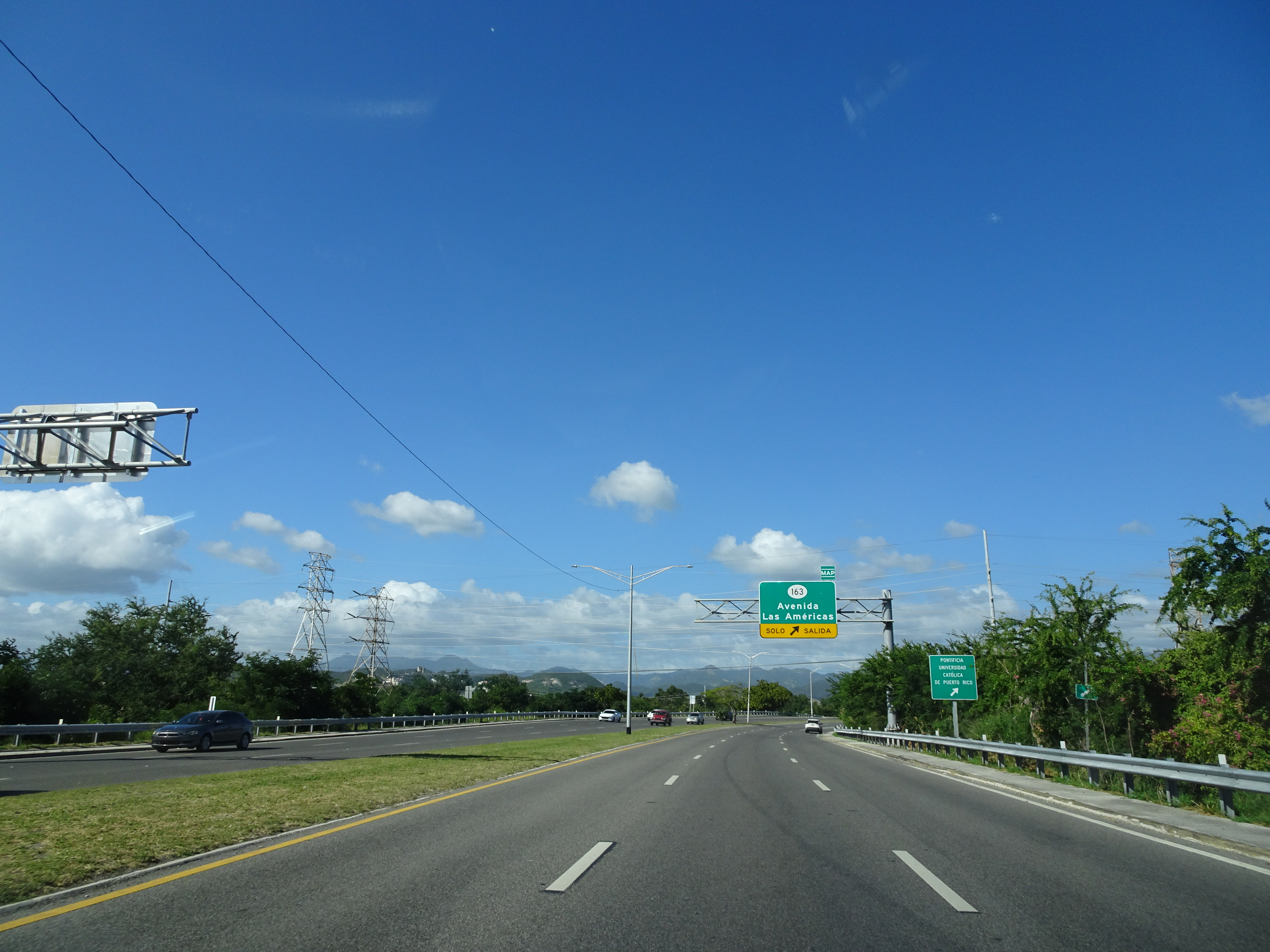
PR-12 north near its exit to PR-163 (Avenida Las Américas)

Location	km	mi	Destinations	Notes
Playa	0.0	0.0	Rafael Cordero Santiago Port of the Americas (Calle A)	At-grade intersection; southern terminus of PR-12; access to the Complejo Recreativo y Cultural La Guancha
Playa	0.4	0.25	PR-123 north	At-grade intersection; southern terminus of PR-123; access to Ponce Playa
Playa	1.0– 1.1	0.62– 0.68	Avenida Caribe	Access to Hilton Ponce Golf & Casino Resort
Playa	1.3	0.81	Ponce Playa (Calle Puerto Viejo)	Southbound exit and entrance; access to the Puerto Rico Department of Labor and Human Resources
Playa	2.1	1.3	PR-52 – San Juan, Juana Díaz, Santa Isabel, Mayagüez	Cloverleaf interchange; PR-52 (unsigned PRI-1) exits 104A and 104B
Playa	2.5	1.6	PR-52 south / PR-Avenida Rafael Cordero Santiago – Mayagüez, Plaza del Caribe	Partial cloverleaf interchange; access to the University of Puerto Rico at Ponce, Judicial Center and the Puerto Rico State Insurance Fund Corporation
San Antón	3.3	2.1	PR-2 – Ponce Este, Ponce Oeste, Mayagüez	Diamond interchange; the Pontifical Catholic University of Puerto Rico access is via PR-2 west
San Antón	4.1	2.5	PR-163 (Avenida Las Américas (Note: Avenida Las Américas is also known as Bulevar Luis A. Ferré.)) – Ponce Centro, Ponce Este	Diamond interchange; Museo de Arte de Ponce and the Pontifical Catholic University of Puerto Rico access is via PR-163 west
San Antón	5.2	3.2	PR-133 (Calle Comercio) – Ponce Centro	Diamond interchange
San Antón	5.1	3.2	PR-1 west (Bulevar Miguel Pou)	Incomplete diamond interchange; southbound exit and entrance; access to Ponce Centro
Machuelo Abajo	5.7	3.5	Calle Obispado (unsigned)	At-grade intersection
Machuelo Abajo	6.4	4.0	PR-14 – Ponce Norte, Adjuntas, Cerrillos	Seagull intersection; northern terminus of PR-12; access to Ponce Centro and Juana Díaz
1.000 mi = 1.609 km; 1.000 km = 0.621 mi: Incomplete access

== See also ==
- List of highways in Ponce, Puerto Rico
- List of streets in Ponce, Puerto Rico
