= María Bibiana Benítez =

Puerto Rican writer

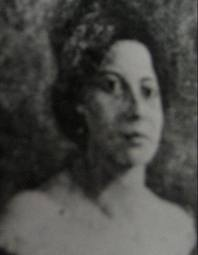
- Born: María Bibiana Benítez Batista; December 10, 1783; Aguadilla, Captaincy General of Puerto Rico, Spanish Empire
- Died: April 18, 1873, or 1875 (89 or 91 years old); San Juan, Captaincy General of Puerto Rico, Spanish Empire
- Occupations: poet, playwright
- Relatives: Alejandrina Benítez de Gautier (niece); José Gautier Benítez (grand-nephew)
- Writing career
- Notable works: Soneto, Diálogo Alegórico, A La Vejez, "La Cruz del Morro"

María Bibiana Benítez Batista (December 10, 1783 – April 18, 1873 or 1875) was a Puerto Rican writer who was Puerto Rico's first female poet and one of its first playwrights. She was the first of three renowned poets in her family, the others being her niece and adopted daughter Alejandrina Benítez de Gautier, and Alejandrina's son José Gautier Benítez.

== Early years ==
Benítez was born in the town of Aguadilla to José Benítez Bermudez and Juana Constanza Batista Rodriguez. She was the second eldest of six brothers and sisters. Her father was a lieutenant in the Spanish Army who was famous for having successfully defended San Juan against a British invasion. Her family loved literature and owned a private library which contained a collection of the best books available at the time. Her father could afford such a luxury since in addition to commanding the military garrison in Ponce, he also served as a sub-delegate to the Royal Intendancy, an important position within the Spanish colonial government, as well as a mayor of the city, meaning that he controlled both the military and civilian powers in one of the island's largest cities. Benítez was able to attend the best private schools where she learned about poetry and composition. María read and studied the classics of the Spanish Golden Age, fostering a fondness for poetry. She remained faithful to Spain, the mother country of Puerto Rico, and King Fernando VII. She was inspired by the Spanish writers Luis de León and Pedro Claderón de la Barca.

At the beginning of her life, María lived in Ponce (from 1797 to 1805), San Juan (from 1805 to 1809), Fajardo (from 1809 to 1819), Mayagüez (from 1819 to 1822), Aguadilla (from 1822 to 1825), and Guayama (1825–1839).

In 1820, one of her brothers Pedro José and his wife died and she took it upon herself to raise her orphaned niece Alejandrina Benítez de Gautier, who would in the future become a renowned poet herself. When María's father died in 1832, she successfully petitioned the colonial governor for a grant of land to see to the welfare of her family.

Around 1841, María lived in Mayagüez. She adopted the town's name as a pseudonym, in addition to Una Mayagüezana (A woman from Mayagüez), Jíbaro de Mayagüez (local from Mayagüez), La dama duende (the elf lady) y Una jibarita (a local girl).

Maria settled in San Juan in her fifties. There, she was an eyewitness to many historical events, which inspired her works. Her home became gathering place for literary discussions between local poets, writers, and intellectuals. She was blind in her later years.

== Literary works ==
In 1832, Benítez published her first poem, La Ninfa de Puerto Rico ("The Nymph of Puerto Rico") in La Gaceta de Puerto Rico, the first newspaper published in Puerto Rico. It is considered to be the first poem written by a Puerto Rican woman. It is also the best known of her poems. La Ninfa is a commemorative ode in neoclassical style inspired by the creation of the first Royal Territorial Supreme Court of Puerto Rico. The poem was placed in the court as a symbol of justice. It reveals Maria's pride in her Puerto Rican territorial affiliation and identity, with intimations of a romantic sensibility yet to come. In the poem, Maria endows the lamb in the center of the Puerto Rican heraldic shield with symbolism of the compliant submissiveness of her colony to the Spanish Crown. Her metaphorical insistence on the passivity and meekness of the lamb perhaps represents the earliest allegory of the figure of the docile Puerto Rican, which more than a century later made a controversial topic of contemporary Puerto Rican intellectual discourse.

Excerpt from La Ninfa de Puerto Rico:

Spanish (original)	English Translation by Roberto Márquez
¡Salud, Santa Justicia, yo te adoro, tu bella luz derrama sobre este suelo de oro que con solemne voto te proclama su tutelar consejo y su tesoro! Del invicto monarca que te envía yo soy la predilecta, que sola presidia en el ameno campo do reflecta de eterna primavera claro día.	Your health! Sacred Justice, I adore you. Your lovely glow cascades to flood this land of gold and its milieu that solemnly, in oath of blood, proclaims you guardian, its treasure most true! Of that bold monarch whose will you convey, I am most dear devotee who's rule and only has held sway over lovely fields and lea of endless spring's perennially clear day.

Several of her works were published in "el Boletín de Instrucción y Mercantil de Puerto Rico" (Instruction and Mercantile Bulletin of Puerto Rico) (1839–1842). She opened the first issue of el Boletín with a sonnet that presents the publication to the reader as one that strives for a different purpose than that of the typical newspaper:

“En este Boletín y en él la cuenta / verás de tu provecho, y tu perjuicio”
"In this Bulletin and in it the account / you will see your advantage, and your prejudice")

She published the poem "La flor y la mariposa" (The Flower and the Butterfly) in 1841, which denounces inconstant men:

"Tu ingratitud la abandona / después de haberla gozado”
"(Your ingratitude abandons her / after having enjoyed her)

In 1858, to commemorate the birth of Alfonso, HRH Prince of Asturias, María published Diálogo Alegórico (Allegorical Dialogue), a play in verse, and received honors from the Imprenta Guasp, a San Juan printing press company. Diálogo is a model for palace literature, written to serve celebrations and other official events.

María wrote La Cruz del Morro ("The Cross of El Morro") in 1862, making her the first Puerto Rican to write a dramatic play. The play premiered at Teatro Municipal, San Juan on June 16, 1897, to commemorate the centennial of the English attack on the city. La Cruz was based on the attack of the city of San Juan by the Dutch with the intention of invading Puerto Rico in 1625 and the defense by the islanders. In the play, Balduino, the captain of the Dutch navy falls in love with Lola and pursues her. Lola is married to Captain Amezquita, a Spanish soldier who is in charge of the defense of el Morro. Balduino promises that the Puerto Rican and Spanish prisoners will be released in exchange for favors from Lola, but she refuses. A final duel between Amezquita and Balduino repairs all grievances. It was not considered a very well-written play, but its patriotic themes inspired loyalty to the Spanish government. The positive representation of female characters in the play makes Maria one of the first feminists of Puerto Rico. The play was recently presented by el Conservatorio de Arte Dramático del Ateneo in March 2011 at the Ateneo Puertorriqueño as part of the XXXIV Festival de Teatro del Ateneo. The production starred Joealis Filippetti, Ricardo Magriñá, Teresita Marrero, Rolando Reyes y Jesús Aguad and was directed by Benigna Ojeda.

In her seventies, she wrote A La Vejez ("To Old Age") (1861), a meditation on aging. Other works include Memorias (“Memories”) (1833), "Soneto" ("Sonnet") (1839), and Romance Histórico (“Historical Romance”).

== Family ==
Benítez never married, but her adopted daughter bore a son, José Gautier Benítez, who grew to become a giant of Puerto Rican poetry. His descendants include Jaime Benítez Rexach, who was the first president of the University of Puerto Rico and was later elected as the island's Resident Commissioner. She was buried at Santa María Magdalena de Pazzis Cemetery.

== See also ==
- List of Latin American writers
- List of Puerto Rican writers
- List of Puerto Ricans
- Puerto Rican literature
- Puerto Rican poetry
- Multi-Ethnic Literature of the United States
- History of women in Puerto Rico
