= Women's Knowledge International =

International group based in Spain

Women's Knowledge International is a program which started in 2011, by initiative of Teresa Langle de Paz and Margarita Benítez. The program was born with the aim of building bridges between theory and feminist activism, using different networks, in order to promote and generate a multiplier effect in such a way that it would entail a substantial improvement in women's lives and the construction of peace. Under the co-direction of Langle de Paz and Benítez, in Washington, D.C., the program is anchored in the Foundation Culture of Peace, chaired by Federico Mayor, and located in Madrid, Spain.

== Origins ==
Despite the institutionalization of Women's Knowledge International in 2011, the development of this initiative started long before through diverse projects:

=== Project Pro/Woman (1986) ===
A pioneer gender studies program in Puerto Rico. It was created in 1986 and ran until 1994atn the University of Puerto Rico – Cayey University of Puerto Rico at Cayey, under Margarita Benítez, as Chancellor. Its goal was to create a community of knowledge about women and gender studies that actively involved both students and professors.

=== Women's Worlds ===
It is recognized as the most important congress of interdisciplinary feminist topics worldwide; it began in 199, and arrived in Spain in 2008, by initiative of Teresa Langle de Paz, with the collaboration of the University of Complutense Madrid. The theme of the congress was the idea "New Borders: Dares and Challenges" and the slogan "Equality is not a utopia", congregating thousands of people from the academic world and the feminist social movements. The key feature of Women's Worlds (WW) congresses is to bridge feminist activism with gender, women's, and feminist studies, to improve women's lives. The organization behind WW is Worldwide Organization of Women's Studies (WOWS), founded in 1996.(2008)

=== Mediterranean Voices ===
Project managed by Teresa Langle de Paz and Rosa Pereda. Initially, it was established with the support of the Cervantes Institute of Rome , directed by Fanny Rubio, and later with the support of the Menéndez Pelayo International University Menéndez Pelayo International University, framed within the political initiative of the United Nations-Alliance of Civilizations Alliance of Civilizations. A Manifesto was presented and signed by important feminist figures in Granada in 2009. The target of this project was to bring together different organizations, experts, intellectuals, artists and writers of both sides ofthe Mediterranean basin for debate about the role of women in the construction of peace and democracy. This was done through the organization of an annual congress, and various curses, workshops and varied publications. (2007-2010)

== Objectives and Vision ==
Women's Knowledge International is a program structured around three ideas: culture of peace, cooperation and non-hierarchical knowledge exchange, and gender equality; all three form a logical frame for the activities. Women's Knowledge International promotes synergies that link feminist theory and practice in all fields of knowledge to foster cultures of peace.

=== Gender Equality ===
Gender equality is established as a human right, an end and a means in itself for culture of peace agendas; it constitutes a basic element in the constitution of democratic and non-violent societies. In this way, the work of Women's Knowledge International is directed towards the achievement of gender equality and the promotion of women's wellbeing and the wellbeing of all, through the empowerment Empowerment of women and improvement of their leadership through education.

=== Culture of Peace ===
Refers to a peace concept that emerged in 1999 from the Declaration and Program of Action on a Culture of Peace, approved by the General Assembly of United Nations (http://www.unesco.org/cpp/uk/projects/sun-cofp.pdf/). This Declaration expresses that peace is not only the absence of armed conflict, but the existence of social harmony, well-being and equality, the eradication of poverty, and respect for democracy and human rights. Promoting equality and democracy are two of the most important principles marked by the agenda ofthe United Nations in 1999, and subsequently endorsed by it in various documents. The promotion of education as well as civil society movements are their main tools. Women's Knowledge International reclaims the necessary active integration and participation of women and of their contribution in all processes of social construction of harmony and democracies.

=== Cooperation and No-Hierarchy ===
Women's Knowledge International claims cooperation as a key element to achieve gender equality and peace. In this case, cooperation is understood as an exchange of knowledge from a horizontal perspective. Its initiatives establish a learning cooperative framework that looks for the complementary nature of scientific and experiential knowledge. The aim is to generate a multiplying positive effect for women that, according to WKI's philosophical approach, is likely to spread to all members of a community and society as a whole.

== Goals and Projects ==
In the first four years of activity of Women's Knowledge International up to this date (2016), diverse educational actions have been undertaken, and different work lines developed around its main goals.

=== Work Lines ===
- Gender and Health

Work line directed by Araceli Alonso, Women's Health and Women's Rights in a Global Perspective professor at the University of Wisconsin Madison (USA) University of Wisconsin–Madison. This area seeks to highlight the link between good health and a broader notion of personal and social wellbeing within the frame of respect for human rights. The programs on gender, health and development carried out in the South East of Kenya by the NGO Nikumbuke- Health by Motorbike, founded and directed by he,r are of particular relevance for WKI. In 2013, these programs won the United Nations Public Service Award United Nations Public Service Awards, by nomination of WKI- Foundation Culture of Peace. In upcoming years, these projects are likely to be expanded as samples of a successful adaptable development model into new territories like Gambia and Tanzania, or Guatemala, Bolivia and Puerto Rico.

- Peace and Democracy-Building

Area led by Nayereh Tohidi – Gender and Women Studies professor at California State University – Northridge, Islamic and Middle East Studies program directo,r and a recognized expert in feminism in the Muslim world. At the present time, WKI is developing a program focused on women's role in peace and democracy-building in Islamic societies. Actions and dialogue have started in Egypt with the collaboration of the Library of Alexandria Library of Alexandria and other partners from the NGO sector.

- Human Rights and Violence

Area coordinated by Chiseche Mibengue – professor at the Hass Center for Public Service, Stanford University (USA) and director of Community Engaged and Public Service. Mibengue is also a writer and United Nations consultant on human rights in Rwanda, Sierra Leone, and the Democratic Republic of Congo. The focus is on the need to build non- violent societies inside-out as a guarantee for human rights and sustainable peace.

Work line coordinated by Nidia Bustillos. An expert researcher in traditional medicine and indigenous cultures in Bolivia. It seeks the establishment of a bond between indigenous women's movements through elements related to health, the environment, and the preservation of ancestral practices. WKI is currently working on the possibility of adapting the HealthbyAnyMeans model to Bolivia, under the leadership of Bustillos.

=== Activities ===
Under the idea of establishing a bridge between scientific and experiential knowledge as well as practical knowledge implementations, different activities have been developed.d

- Publications. Within the projects prompted by Araceli Alonso in Kenya, a book is being prepared, explaining the innovative model on gender, health and development, "Health by Any Means" and its comprehensive approach to gender, health and peace-building.
- Curses. Courses addressed to extending and sharing feminist knowledge; among them: Gender and Development; Gender and Conflict - in collaboration with Jaume I University of Castellon, Spain Jaume I University; Sex Trafficking in partnership with the University of Wisconsin- Madison, USA, and different universities and NGOs in Spain. Study Abroad Course: Spain, Madrid - UW Human Rights and Human Trafficking: Criminalized Economies of Gender and Desire
- Creation of Database. With the purpose of encouraging a comprehensive circulation of knowledge, WKI is working on a project to facilitate and bring free access to feminist sources and knowledge produced by women or about women to a wide public. WKI has inaugurated a free digital library together with its partners at the University of Wisconsin-Madison: Women's Knowledge Digital Library at Memorial Library-University of Wisconsin-Madison
- UNESCO Chair. WKI has promoted the creation of a UNESCO Chair on Gender and Culture of Peace[7] and Culture of Peace with its academic partner, the University of Wisconsin-Madison. This initiative is in correlation with WKI's priorities: developing research, fostering coordination of higher education institutions with non-governmental organizations and social actors, supporting international North-South-South partnerships, and promoting projects around the world for the benefit of women.
- Conferences: WKI understands conferences as dialogue platforms among very diverse sectors and participants, and is promoting interdisciplinary events on specific issues concerning gender issues and women: E.g. "The concept of Wellbeing in the Study of Sex-Trafficking and Sexual Exploitation of Girls and Women" - Universidad Carlos III of Madrid-Instituto de Estudios de Género (Spain); From Structural Violence to Sex-Trafficking - Universidad Carlos III of Madrid (Spain)

== Bibliography ==
Annual Report 2011-2013 Women's Knowledge International, available at: https://www.youtube.com/watch?v=MRmfeCP3pVU

Official Website of Women’s Knowledge International http://www.womensknowledge.org/#!

Tohidi, Nayereh (2013) A report Back from Research visit to Egypt. Women's Knowledge International

Video clip of the program https://www.youtube.com/watch?v=MRmfeCP3pVU

Tanscend Media Service: "Thanks Anyway" - https://www.transcend.org/tms/2014/10/thanks-anyway-a-participants-take-on-seouls-world-alliance-of-religions-peace-summit/

"A Golden Level for Politics: Feminist Emotion and Women's Agency" - Hypatia. A Journal of Feminist Philosophy. Winter 31:1, 2016

Monographic journal with essays: Letra Internacional

Book. Collection of Essays: Voces Mediterráneas. Un espacio de lucha y esperanza. Trama Ed.: Madrid, 2008

List of Winners UNPSA 2013: http://workspace.unpan.org/sites/Internet/Documents/2013%20UNPSA%20Winners%20FINAL.pdf
