= José Benítez (mayor) =

Mayor of Ponce, Puerto Rico

José Benítez y Bermúdez

6th Mayor of Ponce, Puerto Rico
- In office 1800–1800
- Preceded by: Francisco Ortíz de la Renta
- Succeeded by: José Ortíz de la Renta

Personal details
- Born: c. 1760 Riohacha, Colombia
- Died: 11 Aug 1832 Guayama, Puerto Rico
- Spouse: Juana Constanza Batista Rodríguez
- Children: María Bibiana Benítez
- Occupation: Teniente a guerra
- Profession: Military

José Concepción Benítez y Bermúdez (c. 1760 – August 11, 1832) was mayor of Ponce, Puerto Rico in 1800. He is best remembered for the creation of the Fuerte de San José in 1760 in Playa de Ponce. The fort was in operation until the 1890s.

== Background ==
Benítez is best remembered as the military commander who led a group of urban militiamen from Ponce in their defense of San Juan during the British invasion of 1797.

== Family life ==
Benítez married Juana Constanza Batista Rodríguez, and was the father of María Bibiana Benítez, considered the first Puerto Rican female poet.

== Mayoral term ==
As a result of an attempted attack by the English navy, in 1802 Benítez established a shoreline lookout, and set up an artillery battery at El Peñoncillo in Barrio Playa, Ponce, to prevent further attempts by the English from dropping anchor and staging an attack from that area. (Note: This 1802 lookout and battery was different from the fort built in Barrio Playa in 1760, and which had seven cannons mounted in an artillery battery formation. See Socorro Giron. Ponce, el teatro La Perla y La Campana de la Almudaina. Gobierno Municipal de Ponce. 1992. Page 4.) On 1800, Benítez reported that the municipality of Ponce (then called "Partido de Ponce") measured 200 "caballerías", that is, 38,800 acres (60.6 mi^{2}). (Note: 1 caballeria equals 200 cuerdas, or 194 acres. See, Guillermo A. Baralt. Buena Vista: Life and Work on a Puerto Rican Hacienda, 1833-1904. p.xvii.) He categorized the jurisdiction into cotos, hatos, criaderos, monterías, and terrenos realengos. Cotos were lands awarded to residents as reward for their services to the king. They were developed into estancias or lands apt to be cultivated for agricultural use. Hatos were lands not granted to anyone in particular, but available for communal use where cattle could roam at will. Monterías were hilly areas located next to hatos were cattle could be reigned in or gathered together with the help of trained dogs. Criaderos were lands were cows could be herded for milk production. Goats, sheep, pigs, asses, and mares were also herded in criaderos. Terrenos realengos were lands that belonged to the state (to the king).

== Controversies ==
In 1805, Benítez was accused of financial improprieties by a political rival and although a criminal investigation led nowhere, by 1825 the accusations were enough to reduce the war hero to a customs agent in Guayama. After his death in 1832, his family's fortunes were further diminished, but his daughter was able to successfully petition the government for a land grant, which kept them from becoming insolvent.

== Legacy ==
In Ponce, there is a street in Urbanización Las Delicias of Barrio Magueyes named after him.

== See also ==
- List of Puerto Ricans
- List of mayors of Ponce, Puerto Rico

== Notes ==
Political offices
Preceded by Francisco Ortíz de la Renta	Mayor of Ponce, Puerto Rico; 1800-1800	Succeeded by José Ortíz de la Renta
