= Joseph de Toro =

Mayor of Ponce, Puerto Rico

4th Mayor of Ponce, Puerto Rico
- In office 1710–?
- Preceded by: Aurelio Juan Ramírez de Arellano
- Succeeded by: Francisco Ortíz de la Renta

Personal details
- Occupation: Teniente a guerra
- Profession: Military

Joseph de Toro was mayor of Ponce, Puerto Rico, starting in 1710.

== Background ==
De Toro was capitán de granaderos (herdsmen captain), a governmental position, during the 1812 mayoral administration of Jose Ortiz de la Renta.

== Mayoral term ==
Eduardo Neumann Gandia states that Joseph de Toro was mayor of Ponce starting in 1710. It is not known with certainty, however, when De Toro ended his mayoral term. However, it is likely he was still the mayor of Ponce three years later when Puerto Rico governor Francisco Danío Granados ordered, in 1713, that together with those of Coamo, Guaynabo, Caguas, Loiza and Santurce, the hato and estancia owners in the Ponce were to contribute a tax for the reconstruction of the San Antonio bridge in San Juan.

== See also ==
- List of Puerto Ricans
- List of mayors of Ponce, Puerto Rico

Political offices
Preceded by Aurelio Juan Ramírez de Arellano	Mayor of Ponce, Puerto Rico; 1710 - ?	Succeeded by Francisco Ortíz de la Renta
