= Benitez's tree frog =

Conservation status
- Least Concern (IUCN 3.1)

Scientific classification
- Kingdom: Animalia
- Phylum: Chordata
- Class: Amphibia
- Order: Anura
- Family: Hylidae
- Genus: Boana
- Species: B. benitezi

Binomial name
- Boana benitezi (Rivero, 1961)

Synonyms
- Hyla benitezi (Rivero, 1961); Hypsiboas benitezi (Rivero, 1961); Boana pulidoi (Rivero, 1968); Centrolenella pulidoi (Rivero, 1968)

Species of amphibian

Benitez's tree frog (Boana benitezi) is a species of frog in the family Hylidae. It is found in the western part of Guyana Highlands in the Amazonas state of Venezuela and in adjacent Brazil. Until 2008, Boana tepuiana was also included in this taxon. The specific name benitezi honours Jaime Benítez Rexach, the chancellor of the University of Puerto Rico, who supported the expedition during which the holotype was collected.
