= José Gautier Benítez =

Puerto Rican writer

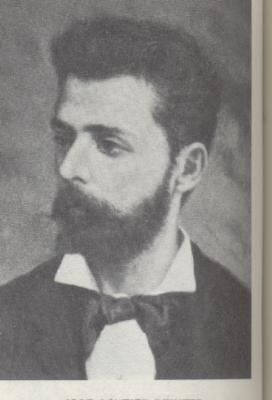
- José Gautier Benítez
- Born: 1851; Caguas, Puerto Rico
- Died: 1880 (aged 28–29); San Juan, Puerto Rico
- Relatives: Alejandrina Benítez de Gautier (mother); María Bibiana Benítez (aunt)
- Writing career
- Notable work: A Puerto Rico
- Notable awards: Ateneo
- Literary movement: Romanticism

José Martín Antonio Gautier Benítez (1851 – 1880) was a Puerto Rican poet of the Romantic Era.

== Early years ==
Gautier Benítez was born in Caguas, Puerto Rico to Rodulfo Gautier and the Puerto Rican poet, Alejandrina Benitez de Gautier. His great-aunt, María Bibiana Benítez, was also a well known Puerto Rican poet. He was mostly influenced by the exponents of the Romantic poetry of the 19th century. His great-great-uncle was José Benítez, mayor of Ponce in 1800.

Gautier Benítez's father wanted him to take up a military career and so in 1865, he was sent to military school in San Juan. When he graduated, he went to Madrid, Spain, where he continued his military education.

When Gautier Benítez returned to Puerto Rico from Spain, he found a job in the provincial government office. According to his military records, between September 26 and November 8 of 1868, Gautier Benítez fought against the members of the "Revolution Committee of Puerto Rico" involved in "El Grito de Lares", a short lived independence revolt against Spanish rule in Puerto Rico.

In 1873 he joined the Liberal Reformist Party and became a principal force behind the creation of the Ateneo Puertorriqueño. In 1878 he became the co-founder, along with his friend Manuel de Elzabura, of the Puerto Rican Review. That same year he wrote his first poem A Puerto Rico (To Puerto Rico), was highly acclaimed by his contemporaries as one of his greatest works. A Puerto Rico also received an award from the Ateneo.

== Later years ==
In 1879, Gautier Benítez's mother, Alejandrina, died and he also became terminally ill with tuberculosis. He retired to his house where he would live until he died. Gautier Benítez died in San Juan, aged 32 years of age and is laid to rest in Santa Maria Magdalena de Pazzis Cemetery in Old San Juan. Gautier Benítez's verses, entitled Poemas (Poems) were published posthumously in 1880.

== Poems by Gautier Benítez ==
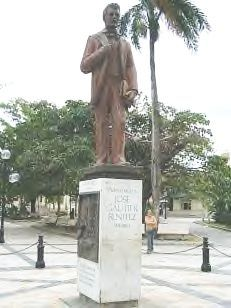
Statue of José Gautier Benítez

Among his works are: A Puerto Rico (Ausencia) (To Puerto Rico (Absence)), A Puerto Rico (Regreso) (To Puerto Rico (Return)) and the following:.

- Americana
- Como Tu Quieras
- Deber De Amar
- El Manzanillo
- El Poeta
- Ella y Yo
- Enfermo
- INSOMNIO
- La Barca
- La Nave
- Las Aves De Paso
- Los Ojos De T.
- Oriental
- Romance
- Un Encargo A Mis Amigos
- Un Sueño
- Zoraida

== Legacy and honors ==
The city of Caguas named a high school and public housing project after Gautier Benítez. The island–municipality of Vieques honored him by naming its public library the José Gautier Benítez Public Library. In the municipality of Hatillo an elementary school was named after him. The song "Lamento Borincano", from Rafael Hernández mentions Gautier Benítez in it "Borinquen, la tierra del edén. La que al cantar, el gran Gautier llamó la perla de los mares." In 2019 construction began on the José Gautier Benítez Development, a mixed-income residential area in Caguas.

== See also ==
- List of Puerto Rican writers
- List of Puerto Ricans
- Puerto Rican literature
- French immigration to Puerto Rico
