= Puerto Rico Highway 133 =

Highway in Puerto Rico

Highway 133
- Ruta 133

Route information
- Maintained by Puerto Rico DTPW
- Length: 2.0 km (1.2 mi)

Major junctions
- West end: PR-1P / PR-123 in Cuarto–Tercero–Segundo–Primero
- PR-14 in Cuarto–Tercero; PR-12 in San Antón
- East end: PR-1 / PR-2 in San Antón

Location
- Country: United States
- Territory: Puerto Rico
- Municipalities: Ponce

Highway system
- Roads in Puerto Rico; List
← PR-132	→ PR-134

Puerto Rico Highway 133 (PR-133) (Note: Sections of this road are also commonly known as Comercio Street, Cuatro Calles Avenue, and La Ceiba Street. It has also been erroneously documented as Federico Parra Duperan street. Per the Archivo Histórico de Ponce, a dependency of the Autonomous Municipality of Ponce, the official name of the Calle Comercio segment of this road is Francisco Parra Duperón. This name (Francisco Parra Duperón) is also documented in some sources such as Luis Fortuño Janeiro's Album Histórico de Ponce.) is a major access road in Ponce, Puerto Rico. The road is 1.2 miles long and consists of three segments called (moving eastward) "Calle Comercio" (a.k.a. "Calle Francisco Parra Duperón"), "Avenida Cuatro Calles", and "Avenida Ednita Nazario". The road has both of its endpoints, as well as its entire length, within the Ponce city limits. It runs west to east. The road is a main access road from downtown Ponce to PR-1, providing access to Guayama and all other points in the eastern portion of the Puerto Rico, and to PR-52, which provides expressway access to San Juan.

== Route description ==
Highway 133 is 1.2 miles long, making it one of Puerto Rico's shortest primary roads.

=== Calle Comercio ===
The road starts at its intersection with Calle Marina (PR-123) at Plaza Las Delicias in downtown Ponce ("Ponce Centro"). From this point the road runs east for three blocks as a one-lane, one-way street and is called Francisco Parra Duperón but it is popularly known as Calle Comercio. At the end of the third block, the road intersects Cruz Street and becomes a two-lane, two-way street. The road runs as a two-way street until its intersection with Río Portugués. Parque de la Ceiba is on the north side of the road at this point.

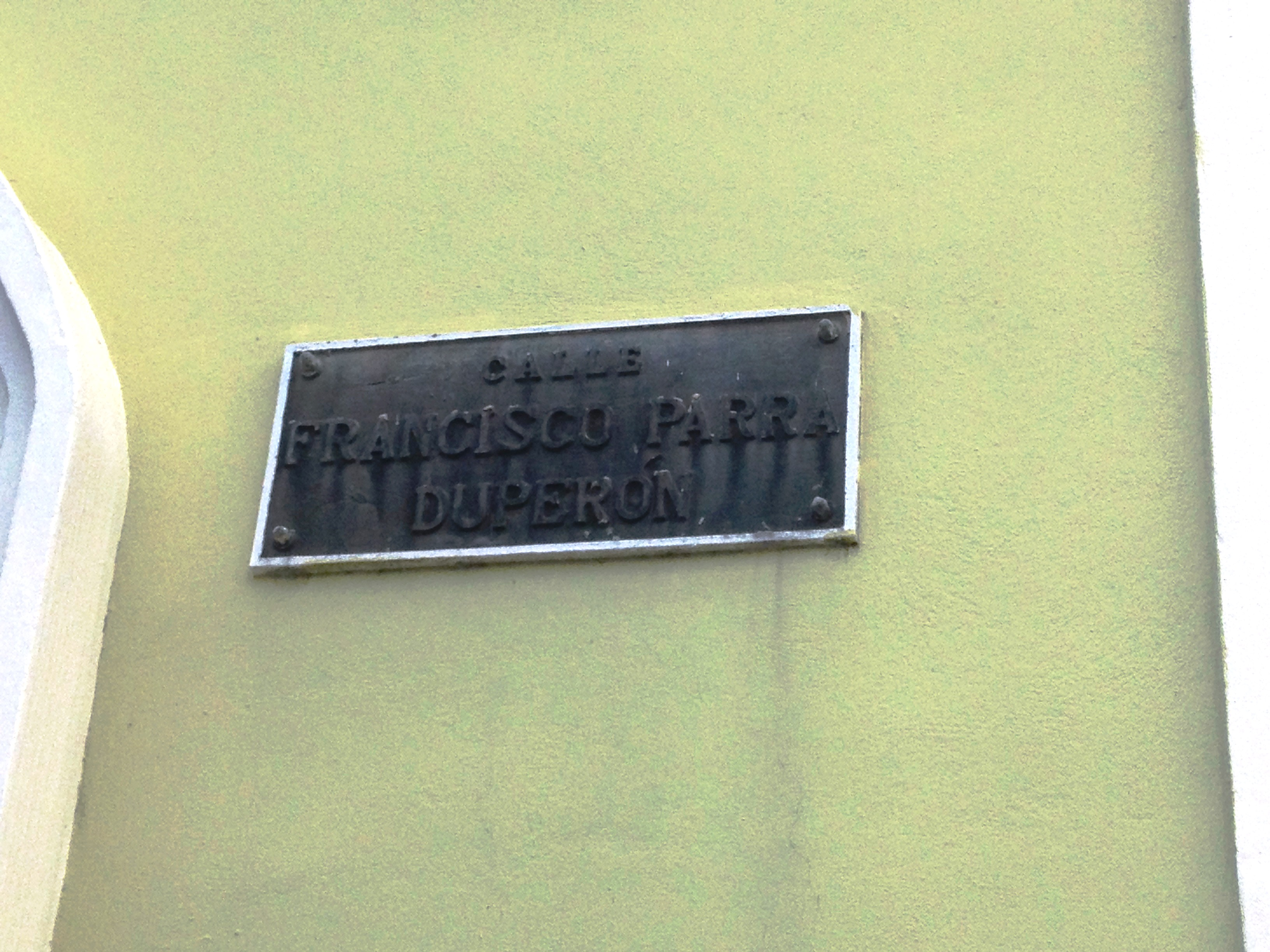
A road sign on PR-133 with the name Francisco Parra Duperón

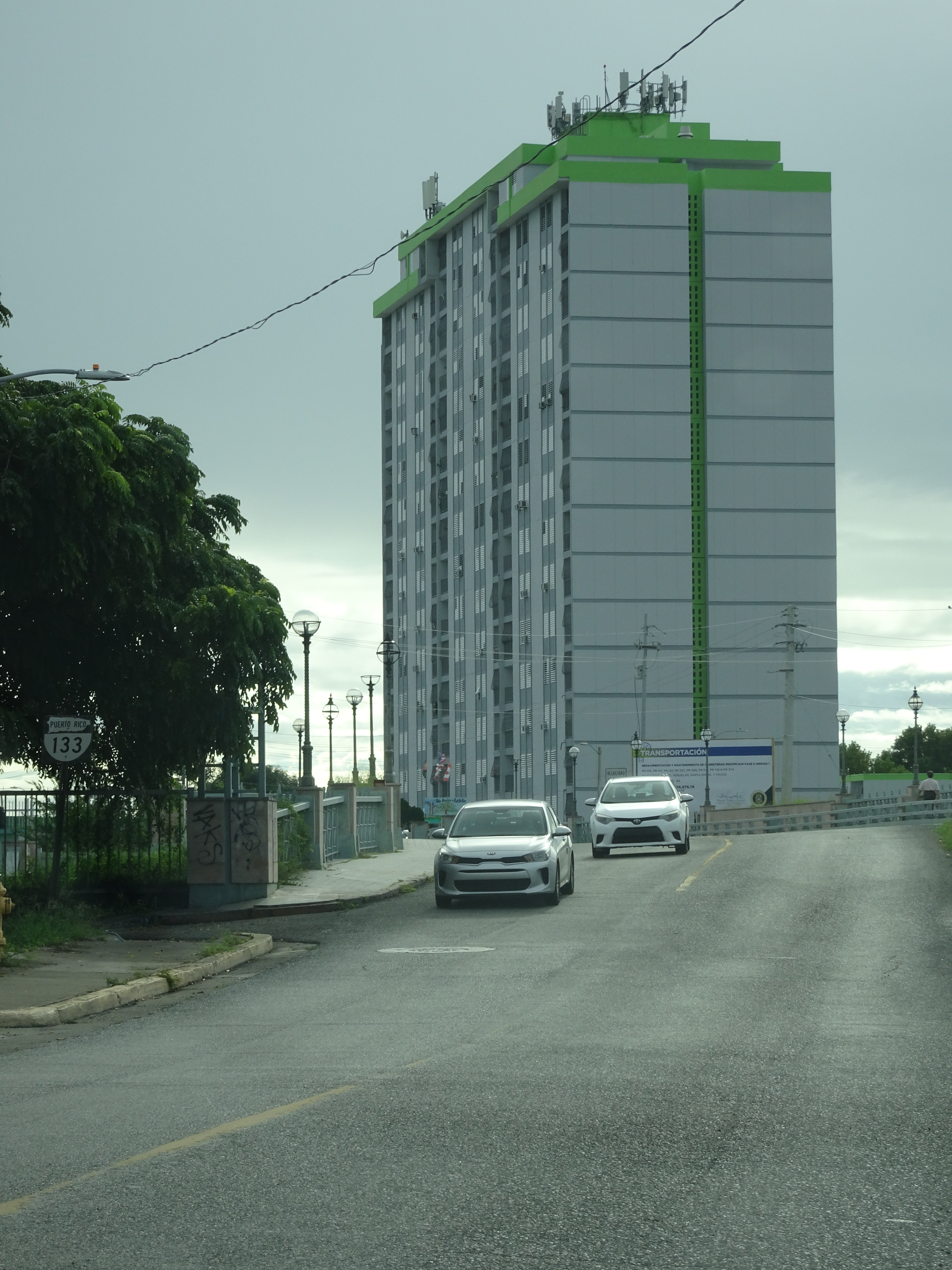
PR-133 west of Río Portugués in Barrio San Antón

=== Avenida Cuatro Calles ===
After crossing Rio Portugués the road is called Avenida Cuatro Calles. The road crosses PR-12 via an underpass (no access to PR-12 at this point) and continues to run in a westerly direction, intersecting with PR-163/Avenida Las Américas at Café Rico, near Centro del Sur Mall.

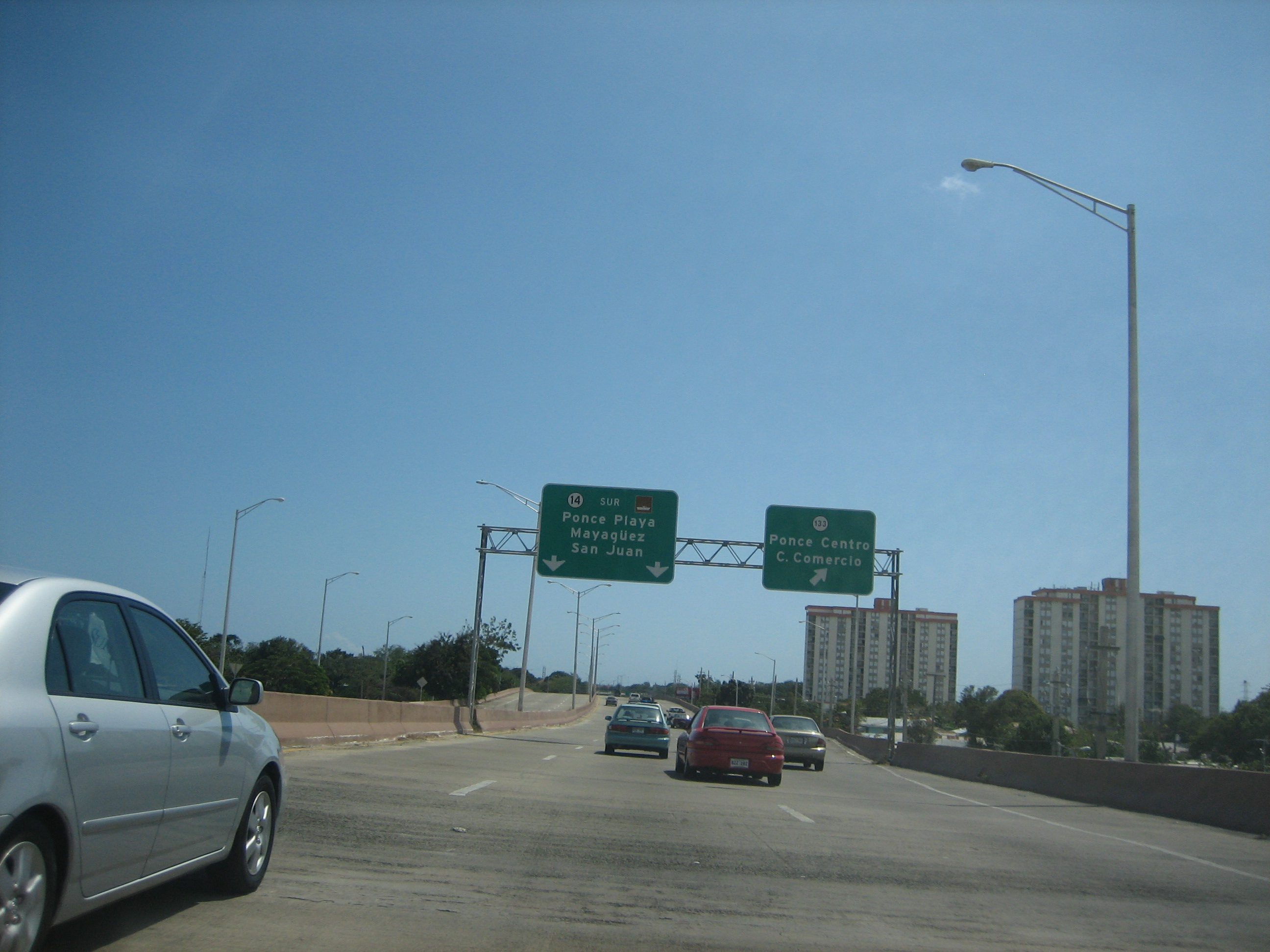
A road sign on the southbound side of PR-12 announcing the PR-133/Comercio Street exit towards Downtown Ponce (Ponce Centro)

=== Avenida Ednita Nazario ===
After crossing Avenida Las Americas the road becomes a 4-lane roadway known as Avenida Ednita Nazario. The former headquarters of Rovira Biscuits Corporation are located on the north side of the road in this section. A public art display consisting of the bust of Ednita Nazario is located at easternmost end of this section of PR-133, on the north side of the road. PR-133 ends at its intersection with the PR-2/PR-1/Miguel Pou Boulevard complex. (Continuing straight east the roadway is six lanes wide and it is a section of Eastbound PR-1 known as "Avenida La Ceiba".)

=== Landmarks ===
Landmarks along this road include Ceiba Tree Park, located next to Río Portugués, Café Rico, and Rovira Biscuits Corporation. A monument to Ednita Nazario is located at the northwest corner of PR-133 and PR-2.

== Major intersections ==
The entire route is located in Ponce.

Location	km	mi	Destinations	Notes
Cuarto–Tercero– Segundo–Primero quadripoint	2.0	1.2	PR-1P (Calle Marina) / PR-123 – Ponce	Western terminus of PR-133; one-way streets
Cuarto–Tercero line	1.8	1.1	PR-14 north (Calle Salud) – Ponce	One-way street
San Antón	1.0– 0.9	0.62– 0.56	PR-12 (Avenida Santiago de los Caballeros) – Ponce, San Juan, Mayagüez	Diamond interchange
San Antón	0.6	0.37	[[Puerto Rico Highway Avenida Las Américas |PR-Avenida Las Américas]] – Ponce	
San Antón	0.0	0.0	PR-1 to PR-52 (Autopista Luis A. Ferré) – Ponce, San Juan PR-2 west (Ponce Bypass) – Peñuelas, Mayagüez	Eastern terminus of PR-133
1.000 mi = 1.609 km; 1.000 km = 0.621 mi

== See also ==
- List of highways in Ponce, Puerto Rico
- List of streets in Ponce, Puerto Rico
