= Francisco Ortiz de la Renta =

Mayor of Ponce, Puerto Rico

5th Mayor of Ponce, Puerto Rico
- In office 1 January 1766 – 1800 ?
- Preceded by: Joseph de Toro
- Succeeded by: José Benítez

Personal details
- Born: c. 1726
- Died: c. 1806

Francisco Ortiz de la Renta (c. 1726 – c. 1806) was a Teniente a guerra Mayor of Ponce, Puerto Rico, from 1 January 1766 to 31 December 1800, when José Benítez took over the mayoral administration.

== Background ==
Francisco Ortiz de la Renta was a descendant of the founder of San Germán, on the hills of Santa Marta, next to Río Guanajibo, in 1573. As teniente a guerra, he was the administrative head of the municipality.

== See also ==
- List of Puerto Ricans
- List of mayors of Ponce, Puerto Rico

== Notes ==
Political offices
Preceded by Joseph de Toro	Mayor of Ponce, Puerto Rico; 1 January 1766 – 1800?	Succeeded by José Benítez
