= Title-V Graduate Programs =

Title V of the Higher Education Act (HEA) is a federally funded grant program, created in 1998 to assist certain colleges and universities in improving the higher education of Hispanic students in the United States. It is also known as the Developing Hispanic-Serving Institutions Program, being directed towards what are designated as Hispanic-serving institutions (HSIs).

== Historical background ==
The United States Higher Education Act of 1965 was signed into law on November 8, 1965. The law was intended "to strengthen the educational resources of our colleges and universities and to provide financial assistance for students in postsecondary and higher education".

The research that led to the creation of Title V found that HSIs provided a significant proportion of postsecondary opportunities for Hispanic students, while receiving less in state and local funding per student than other institutions of higher education. This was found to be limiting their ability to expand and improve programs and institutional strength. HSIs were defined as those with low education and general expenditures, and 25 percent or more full-time equivalent undergraduate Hispanic students of whom 50 percent or more were low-income.

== Provisions of Title V ==
Title V funding was granted to higher educational institutions to enable them to improve and expand their provision for Hispanic students and other low-income students. Such activities could include the renovation of instructional facilities, faculty development, the purchase of scientific or laboratory equipment for teaching, financial and administrative management, development and improvement of academic programs, joint use of facilities, academic tutoring, counseling programs, and student support services. Grants covered a period of up to 5 years.

== Impact ==
In 2006, $95 million was awarded to 151 HSIs under Title V. Research found that the "sustained institutional funding" provided under Title V had an effect on the number of degrees awarded.

== Title V expansion ==
In 2009 Title V was expanded. For the first time it provided funding for graduate programs of HSIs in its new "Part B" section ("Promoting Postbaccalaureate Opportunities for Hispanic Americans"). The stated purposes were to expand postbaccalaureate educational opportunities for, and improve the academic attainment of, Hispanic students; and to expand and improve postbaccalaureate academic programs in those institutions of higher education that were educating large numbers of Hispanic and low-income students.
