= Alejandrina Benítez de Gautier =

Puerto Rican poet

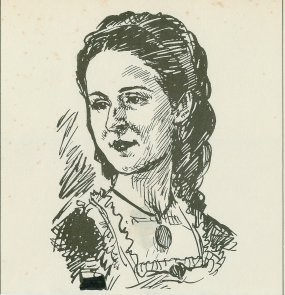
- Alejandrina Benítez de Gautier
- Born: Alejandrina Benítez De Arce; February 26, 1819; Mayagüez, Puerto Rico
- Died: October 11, 1879 (aged 60); San Juan, Puerto Rico
- Occupation: poet
- Children: José Gautier Benítez
- Relatives: María Bibiana Benítez (aunt)

Alejandrina Benítez de Gautier (Note: This name uses Spanish marriage naming customs; the first is the maiden family name "Benítez" and the second or matrimonial family name is "Gautier".) (February 26, 1819 – October 11, 1879) was a Puerto Rican poet.

== Early years ==
Benítez de Gautier, (birth name: Alejandrina Benítez De Arce) was born in Mayagüez, Puerto Rico and became an orphan at an early age. She moved to San Juan and lived with her aunt, the poet and author María Bibiana Benítez who raised her and looked after her education.

== Poet ==
Benítez de Gautier, inspired by her aunt, became an accomplished poet. She became a member of a group of young writers which were considered as the members of the first generation of the Puerto Rican poets and writers who founded what is known as Puerto Rican literary culture. Benítez de Gautier gained recognition as a poet with her collaboration in the "Aguinaldo Puertorriqueño" (Collection of Puerto Rican Poetry) which was published in 1843 gave her recognition as a poet.

Benítez de Gautier wrote a poem entitled La Patria del Genio (The Nation of the Genius) dedicated to Jose Campeche; for this poem she was awarded 100 Spanish pesos from the "La Sociedad Económica Amigos del País" (Friends of the Economic Society of Puerto Rico).

She had an affair with a provisional intendant, Rodulfo Gautier and on November 12, 1851, bore him her first child, José Gautier Benítez who was to become a famous poet, out of wedlock in the City of Caguas, Puerto Rico. She later married Rudolfo (thus adding de Gautier to her surname) and legitimized her relationship. She moved with her husband to his farmstead in Caguas and became involved in the slave trade business. In 1857, her husband died and the widow moved once more to San Juan with her aunt.

Benítez de Gautier did not write any poems from 1846 to 1861. In 1861, new poems by Benítez de Gautier which were published in the local journals began to appear. Among her best known poem of the time was "A Submarine Cable to Puerto Rico". In said poem she pays tribute to the knowledge and engineering that went into the establishment of telegraph service between Puerto Rico and St. Thomas. Her youngest daughter was diagnosed with pulmonary tuberculosis and died from the illness in 1875, the same year that her aunt died. Benítez de Gautier died in 1879 at the age of 60. She was buried at the Santa María Magdalena de Pazzis Cemetery in San Juan

== Legacy ==
New York City has honoured her memory by naming a school after her in her honour. The school is located in area of the borough of Brooklyn known as Bushwick. The official Department of Education designation of the school is P.S.377.

== See also ==
- List of Puerto Rican writers
- List of Puerto Ricans
- Puerto Rican literature
- French immigration to Puerto Rico
- List of Latin American writers
- Multi-Ethnic Literature of the United States
- History of women in Puerto Rico
