= Rafael Cordero Santiago Port of the Americas =

Megaport under construction in Ponce, Puerto Rico

Port of The Americas
- The "Port of The Americas" Logo
- Interactive map of Port of The Americas

Location
- Location: Barrio La Playa, Ponce, Puerto Rico
- Coordinates: 17.969099°N 66.617918°W

Details
- Opened: 1804
- Operated by: Autonomous Municipality of Ponce
- Owned by: Ponce Municipal Government
- Type of Harbor: Natural/Artificial
- Land area: 1,000 acres (1.6 sq mi)
- No. of piers: 8
- Executive Director: Carlos I Mejias Algarin
- Cranes: 3
- Channel depth: 50 feet (15 m)

Statistics
- Annual cargo tonnage: 623,271
- Annual container volume: 250,000 TEU
- Main exports: Scrap metal, chemicals, clinker, cement
- Main imports: Coal, lumber, molasses, syrup, chemicals, gypsum
- Rail traffic: 18,500 tons
- Website www.portoftheamericas.com

The Rafael Cordero Santiago Port of the Americas —Spanish: Puerto de las Américas Rafael Cordero Santiago (PLA)— is a megaport currently under construction in Ponce, Puerto Rico. The project aims to convert the current Port of Ponce into a value-added tax-free customs-free international shipping hub similar to, though not as large as, the megaports located in Singapore and Rotterdam. The Port of the Americas is Puerto Rico's main Caribbean port, and, at a depth of 50 feet, it is also the deepest port in the Caribbean.

The port was originally overseen by the Port of the Americas Authority (Spanish: Autoridad del Puerto de las Américas) a defunct government-owned corporation of Puerto Rico. As of December 2012, it was overseen by the newly created Autoridad del Puerto de Ponce. The Authority reported that when completed, the new port will have a storage capacity of 2.2 Million TEUs. The Authority also reported that the port handled an estimated 504,044 short tons of cargo in 2007, and projected it to handle over 1.5 million in 2012.

On 12 December 2011, the government of Puerto Rico transferred control of the port to the Ponce municipal government, when governor Luis Fortuño signed to create the Ponce Port Authority—Spanish: Autoridad del Puerto de Ponce (APP)— an independent government-owned corporation ascribed to the Ponce municipal government.

== Port of Ponce (current port) ==
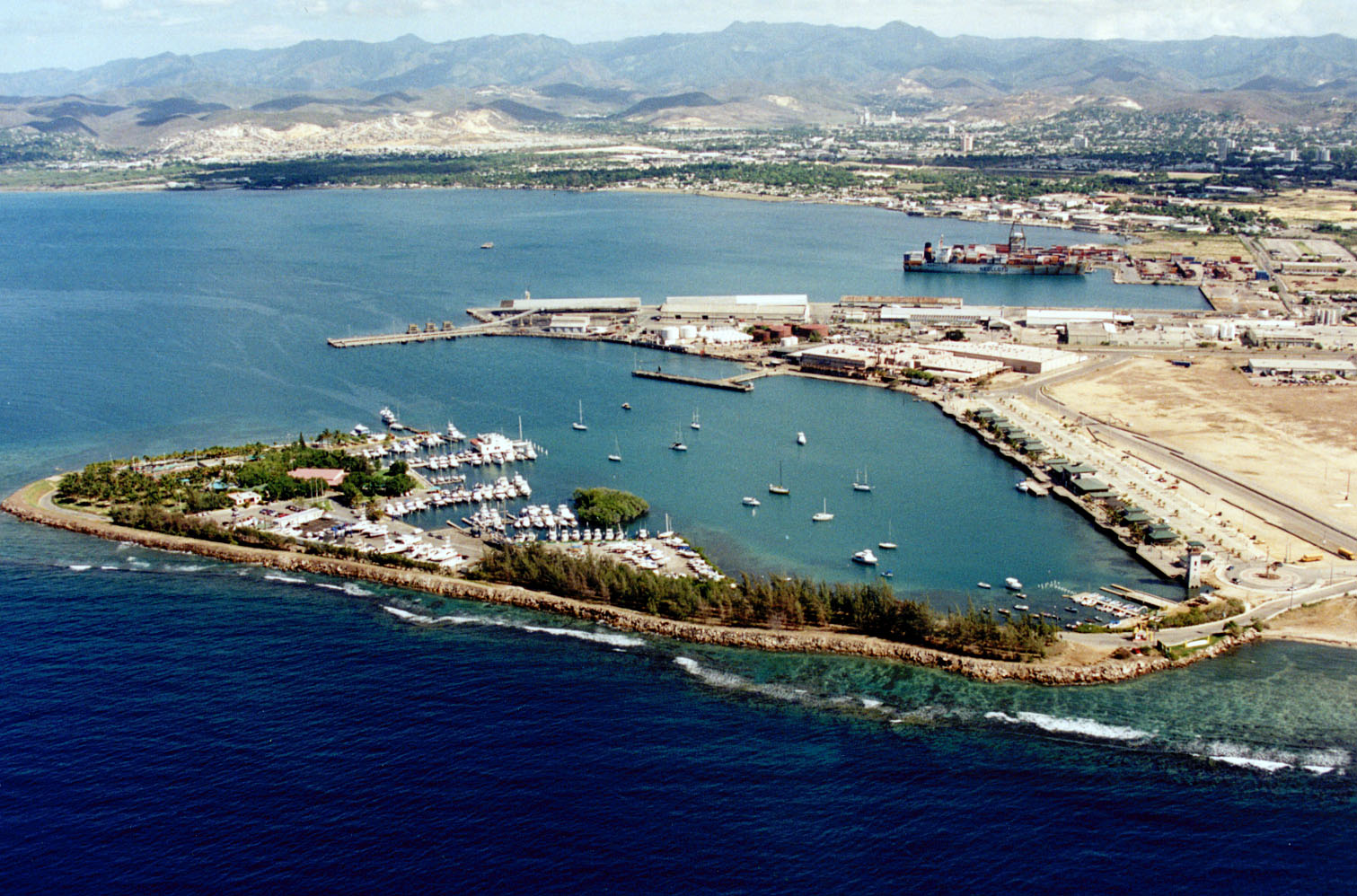
This 1999 photograph of the Port of Ponce and its surrounding lands was taken before the proposed expansion. In the foreground are the Club Náutico de Ponce and La Guancha Boardwalk. At the background is barrio Playa de Ponce. Further in the background are barrio Canas and the hills of west of Ponce.

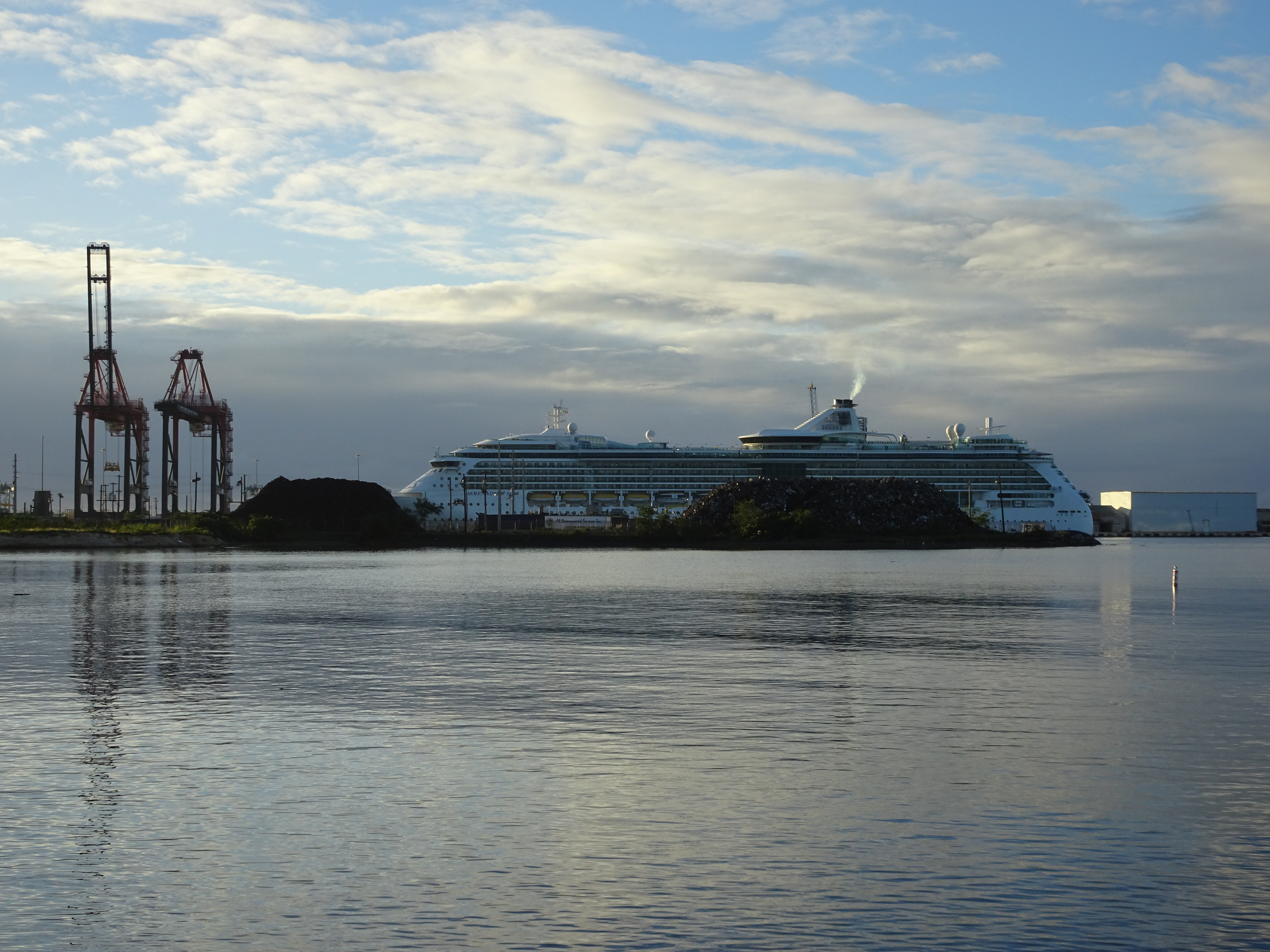
The cruise ship Serenade of the Seas arriving at the Port of Ponce on 2 January 2020.

The current port, named the Port of Ponce, is located (Note: The location of the Port of Ponce has always been at the Bahía de Ponce. Its facilities --such as its docks-- have been located at three different sites within Bahia de Ponce: The first location (1789 - c. 1900) was at what is now called "Puerto Viejo" (literally, "Old Port"), and was located at approximately the midpoint between Punta Peñoncillo (Punta Peñoncillo is where the current [2019] docks are located) and the area immediately south of the end Avenida Hostos Final (See, Eduardo Questell Rodriguez. Ni Uno ni Dos son mas los nacidos en Cayo Cardona. Ponce, Puerto Rico: Es Noticia. Edición 94. 12 to 25 April 2019. p. 6.) The second docks (c. 1898 - c. 1920) were located at what was called El Muelle Americano, The American Dock (See, The Occupation of Ponce. Harper's Weekly. Cover page. Vol. XLII (42), Issue 2176. 3 September 1898. See also, Paul Miller. Historia de Puerto Rico. New York: Rand McNally and Compañia. 1922. p. 413.) The third (c. 1920 - now), and current, port is located on Punta Peñoncillo.) in the southern tip of the city of Ponce, 1.5 miles south of the intersection of PR-52 and PR-12. The port was created on 28 February 1789, through the Royal Decree of Spanish King Carlos IV de Borbón. It started operating commercially in 1804.

=== History ===
==== 1800–1950 ====
During 1800–1850, the Port of Ponce became the heart of Ponce's economic control. During this time the Port, with its adjacent massive construction of commercial buildings, stores and warehouses, "became more important to the national [Puerto Rican] economy than San Juan's. By 1890 the Port was exporting 33.2% of the national production, compared with 21.2% exported from San Juan."

The port has been operated by the municipality of Ponce since 1911, when then-mayor Moret received from the Government of the United States of America a franchise for the city of Ponce to operate the Port of Ponce in perpetuity. The port has been an important part of the island's economy, especially to the sugar cane and coffee industry during the first half of the 20th century. In 1913 the municipality completed a covered pier of concrete and steel with ample depth of water and railroad connections. In 1918 almost 20% of merchant traffic into and out of the Island occurred through this port. The Ponce port is currently the only port in Puerto Rico that is operated as well as owned by a municipal government. The port has 8 piers, numbered 1 through 8.

==== 1950s ====
Operations at the Port of Ponce were significantly reduced during the second half of the 20th century, mainly due to the decay of the agricultural industry of the Island and the fact that the government shifted most shipping imports and exports to the San Juan Port located in the island's capital of San Juan. The Port of San Juan became Puerto Rico's main shipping port during this time, experiencing significant expansion projects and heavy traffic year-round, while the Port of Ponce was left to handle mostly local operations. It is estimated that 90% of all goods exported or imported in Puerto Rico passed through the Port of San Juan. It has been reported that the Port of Ponce handles about 40% of Puerto Rico's "loose shipping traffic." These situations led the mayor of Ponce to seek the transfer of Port of Ponce facilities and operations from the government of the Commonwealth to the Ponce municipal government.

==== 1990s ====
Following these ownership changes, several improvements were made to the Port of Ponce, most of them under the administration of late mayor Rafael "Churumba" Cordero Santiago. These improvements included repaving worn-out roads, the addition of the short Port of Ponce Railroad system for transporting oil and chemicals from ships to holding tanks via tanker cars (although it is now rarely in operation), and a cruise ship terminal. The port had one quay side crane in operation before the Port of the Americas project got under way, and a second crane was acquired soon after the project began in 2004. The design and addition of a free trade zone within the Port of Ponce has also been studied.

==== 2010s ====
On 12 December 2011, the Government of Puerto Rico transferred control of the Port of The Americas to the Ponce municipal government, when governor Luis Fortuño Burset signed Senate Bill #2393 to create the Autoridad del Puerto de Ponce (Ponce Port Authority) officially. The administration of the Port of Ponce was to also administer the Port of the Americas.

The port seeks to position itself into the international shipping hub. The city continues to search how to best make use of its port's potential, and various business models have been studied. Some have met with strong opposition from San Juan, as was the case in 2003, when there was significant opposition from the International Longshoremen's Association there to moving freight traffic from the San Juan port to the Port of the Americas. The city also seeks to position itself into the cruise ship terminal space. To this end, facilities have also been developed to accommodate cruise ships. Two cruise lines, Holland America and Celebrity, make occasional stops in its port. The municipality is seeking to build a new tourist wharf at Avenida Hostos with a total length of 1,200 feet and a width of 160 feet. This will allow two mega cruise ships to dock simultaneously. The estimated cost in 2011 was $57.6M USD, with the expected creation of 600 jobs. Historians have located records showing cruise ships docking at the Ponce port at least since March 1979. With the goal of increasing tourism and improve the local economy, the city has toyed with the idea that Mercedita Airport could be use as a fly-in destination for passengers that would then depart for a cruise vacation from its cruise terminal at the Port.

== Port of the Americas (future port) ==
=== History ===
Records show that at least by the mayoral administration of José Tormos (1977-1984), a group of municipal officials had visited Washington in September 1979 seeking $23 million to finance the megaport project. By then Puerto Rico's economy was highly dependent on an export manufacturing industry, which in turn relied on substantial federal and commonwealth government tax subsidies. Political and business leaders alike agreed that, in order to secure Puerto Rico's economic future, the island had to diversify its economy and improve its attractiveness to manufacturers and similar businesses since it could not rely solely on tax benefits. Therefore, the government decided to invest heavily in developing tourism areas, such as new passenger cruise ship terminals at the San Juan Port, and to initiate plans to convert Puerto Rico into the leading manufacturing and shipping location in the Caribbean. During the late 1990s, the megaport project obtained significant support when the US federal government decided to phase out most of the federal tax subsidies awarded to manufacturing companies in Puerto Rico, and after the neighboring countries of Jamaica and the Dominican Republic announced plans to create megaports of their own.

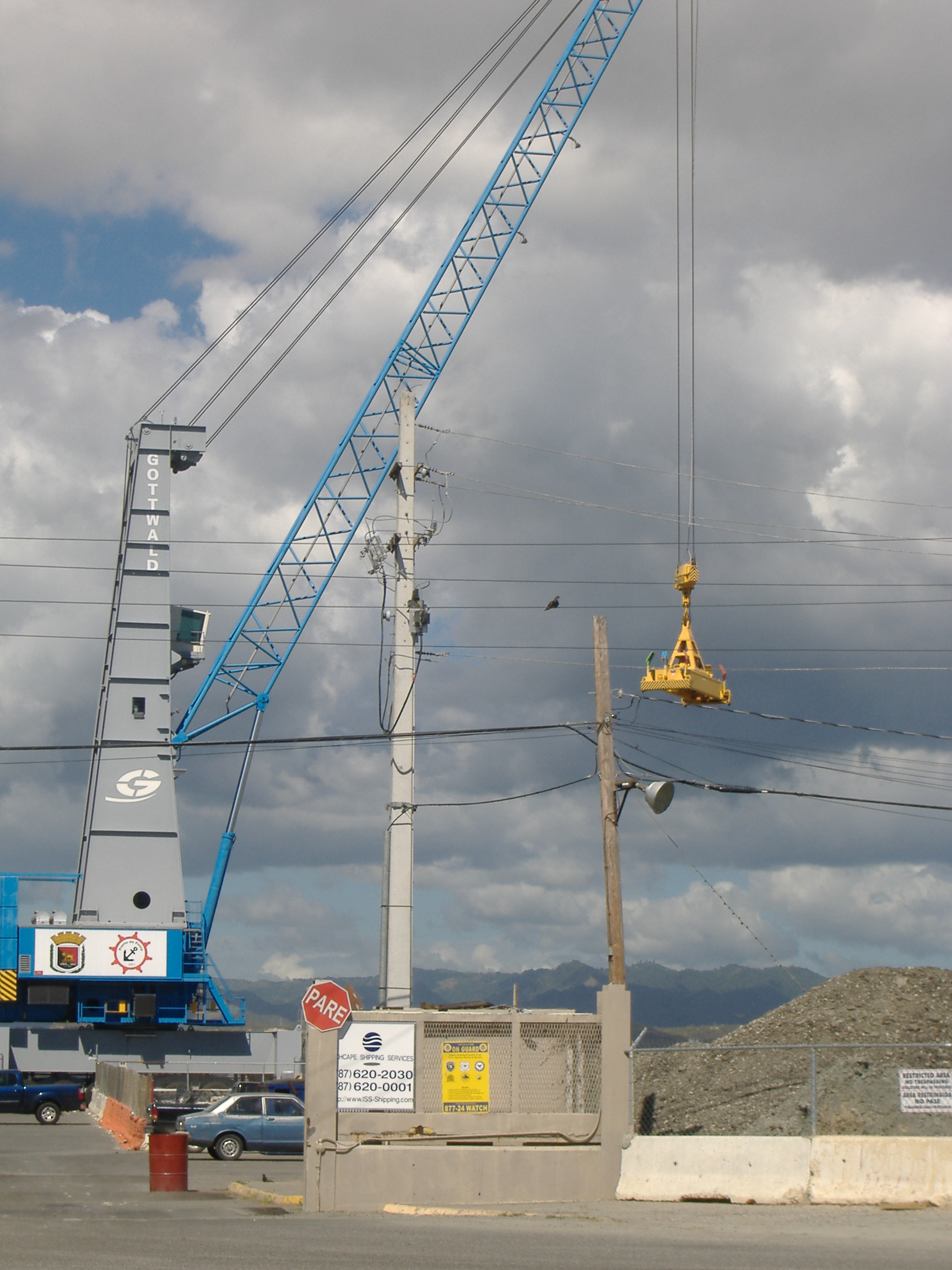
A new quay crane was installed as part of the port expansion project in 2005.

==== Potential locations ====
The Government of the Commonwealth soon began researching the viability of a megaport in Puerto Rico by conducting land studies throughout the island, economic studies both in Puerto Rico and the Caribbean, and visiting existing megaports, such as the Port of Singapore and the Port of Rotterdam, in order obtain an idea of a megaport's operations and impact on local economies. These studies revealed the need for a large transshipment port in the Caribbean region to facilitate distribution from the emerging markets in Asia and the US west coast to the eastern coasts of North, Central and South America. The government also found that Puerto Rico had several advantages over its Caribbean competitors, which included first-class infrastructure (such as highways and several airports), strong economic and political ties with the United States, and the island's close proximity to the Mona Passage (a large and deep channel between Puerto Rico and the Dominican Republic through which most ships sail when traveling between the Panama Canal and the US eastern coast). During this research stage, three potential locations were considered for the megaport

- San Juan Port – This consideration contemplated moving most local shipping operations to other ports on the island and expanding the Port of San Juan into an international megaport.
- Ponce/Guayanilla/Peñuelas Port – This option contemplated leaving most local operations in San Juan, while converting the Port of Ponce into an international megaport with additional port facilities in the nearby towns of Guayanilla and Peñuelas.
- Roosevelt Roads (RR) Port – This possible location came into consideration after the US Navy closed its Roosevelt Roads Naval Station in the town of Ceiba. The naval station had adequate piers and quay side, a small airport, and large sections of undeveloped lands. The plan envisioned leaving local operations in San Juan and other local ports while expanding the naval station's port facilities into a megaport. This option was complicated by the fact that the area was not under the jurisdiction of either the Ceiba municipal government or the government of the Commonwealth, but under that of the U.S. federal government, and would have required either a land concession or a low-cost sale to make the option viable.

==== Ponce chosen ====
Ponce mayor Rafael Cordero Santiago lobbied heavily for the location of the megaport to be in his hometown of Ponce before his untimely death in early 2004. He argued that Ponce already included adequate port facilities, a nearby airport, sufficient road and highway infrastructure, and the availability of approximately 1,000 acres (4.0 km^{2}) adjacent to the port area for immediate development. Expanding the San Juan Port became unattractive as it had run out of land area for any further expansion, while locating the mega port in Guayanilla was abandoned because of environmental concerns in the area. In the end, the Commonwealth government decided to award the location of the Port of the Americas to the City of Ponce. As an act of remembrance, the Government of the Commonwealth signed into law the creation of the Port of the Americas project and named the Rafael Cordero Santiago Port of the Americas after the late mayor.

=== Management and operation ===
The Port of the Americas Project is currently owned and managed by the Port of the Americas Authority (APA, from its Spanish acronym), a joint venture between the Autonomous Municipality of Ponce and the Government of the Commonwealth of Puerto Rico. APA's current executive director is Ramon Torres Morales, an engineer who is also the executive director of the current Port of Ponce. The Authority also has a board of directors. Sitting on that board are Puerto Rico's Secretary of Economic Development, the Director of the Puerto Rico Industrial Development Company (PRIDCO), Puerto Rico's Secretary of Transportation, and the mayors of Ponce, Guayanilla, and Peñuelas. The Board also includes several other business and civic leaders. It is estimated the Port of the Americas will generate 100,000 jobs. Jorge Hernandez Lazaro served as executive director.

=== Project phases ===
The Port of the Americas construction project is divided into four main phases which will add 3,000 feet (910 m) of quay side to the Port of Ponce, dredge the existing port entrance and nearby bay to a depth of 50 feet (15 m), and develop adjacent lots into new container yards. This project would allow the actual Port of Ponce to handle three post-panamax vessels at any given time (Puerto Rico previously could not handle these types of ships due to relatively shallow depths) and increase its annual throughput to a total of 1.4 million twenty-foot equivalent units (TEU). Final project costs are currently estimated at US$750 million.

- Phase 1 - The first phase of the project adds 1,200 ft (365.76 m) of quay to the existing piers, which will then accommodate four modern quay cranes with a rail gauge of 100 ft (30.48 m). This phase finished two months ahead of schedule in late 2004.
- Phase 2 - The second phase, which began in 2005, aims to dredge the existing Ponce bay near the entrance of the Port, the entrance channel and the piers to a depth of 50 ft (15.24 m), making them the deepest in the Caribbean. The dredging will relocate approximately 5.5 million cubic meters of marine soil . This phase also includes developing 18 acres (73,000 m^{2}) adjacent to the current piers to increase its yard capacity by 250,000 twenty-foot equivalent units (TEU) of annual throughput.
- Phase 3 - This phase plans to convert land adjacent to the current port into a 50 ft (15.24 m) deep canal adding 1,500 ft (460 m) of quay side for additional vessels and developing other sections near the future canal to increase total annual throughput to 700,000 TEU.
- Phase 4 - The final stage will add another 50-foot-deep (15 m) canal, adding 1,500 feet (460 m) of quay side, and developing adjacent lands into new container yards, increasing the Port's annual throughput to a total of 1,400,000 TEU.

== Development ==
On 21 January 2010, two huge post-panamax cranes arrived at the Port of the Americas from Shanghai, China. They were built by ZPMC at a cost of $22.7 million. In addition to the two post-Panamax cranes, the port's inventory consists of one Gottwald crane—used for "loose" freight—and seven Rubber Tire Gantry cranes, purchased in 2008 for handling container freight.

On 26 September 2011, the Governor of Puerto Rico transferred the entire governance structure of the Port of the Americas to the Ponce Municipal Government to be managed by an authority to be created at the municipal level, called "Autoridad del Puerto de Ponce" (Ponce Port Authority). As part of the transfer accord the commonwealth-level Autoridad del Puerto de las Americas (POTA Authority) ceased to exist. The transfer was made pursuant to Mayor Melendez's "Solucion Ponceña". The transfer became law on 12 December 2011.

The post-panamax cranes were first put into commercial use on 21 December 2011 with the offloading of five containers destined to Campamento Santiago in Salinas, Puerto Rico. The operation required the support of the Ponce Municipal Police Marine Unit, Fuerzas Unidas de Rapida Accion (United Forces for Fast Action, FURA), the Ponce Municipal Office for Emergency Management, the Puerto Rico Police, the Puerto Rico Fire Corps, the U.S. Coast Guard, the Puerto Rico National Guard, and POTA personnel.

== Gallery ==
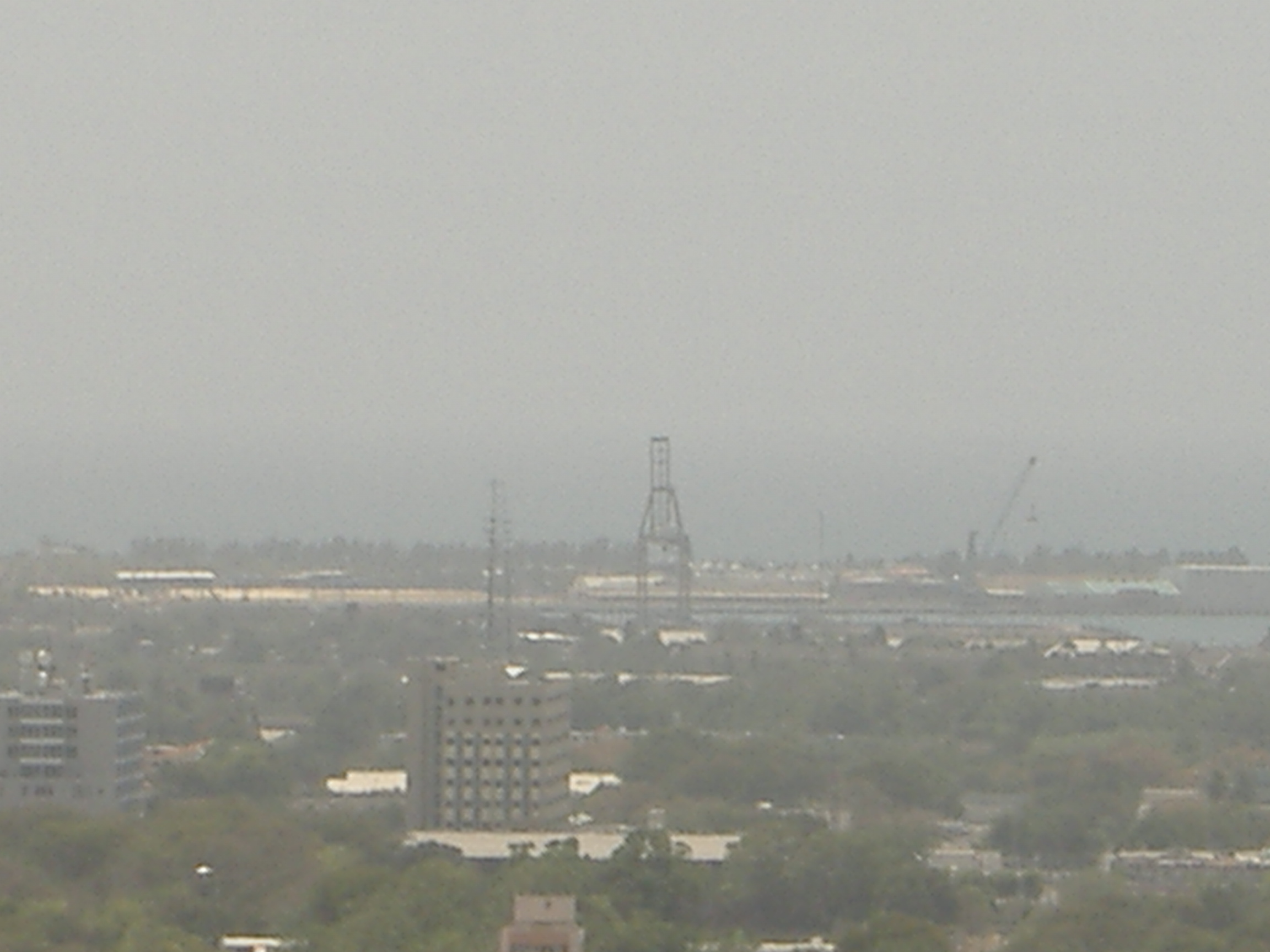
Distant view of the Port of The Americas from Vigia hill

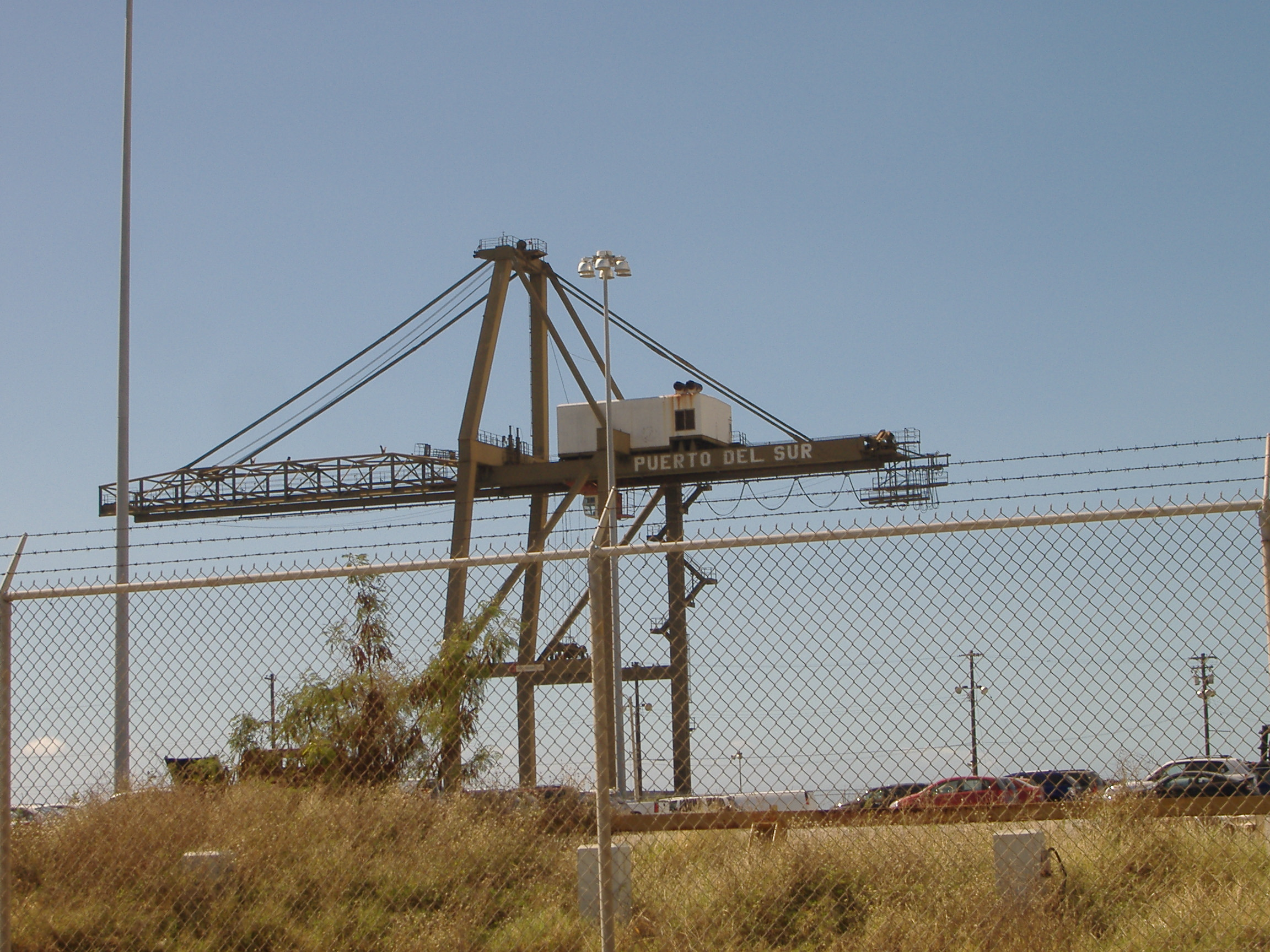
The original port quay crane is still in operation

== See also ==
- Transportation in Puerto Rico
- Port of Mayagüez
- Port of San Juan
- Ship Transport
