= List of islands of Ponce, Puerto Rico =

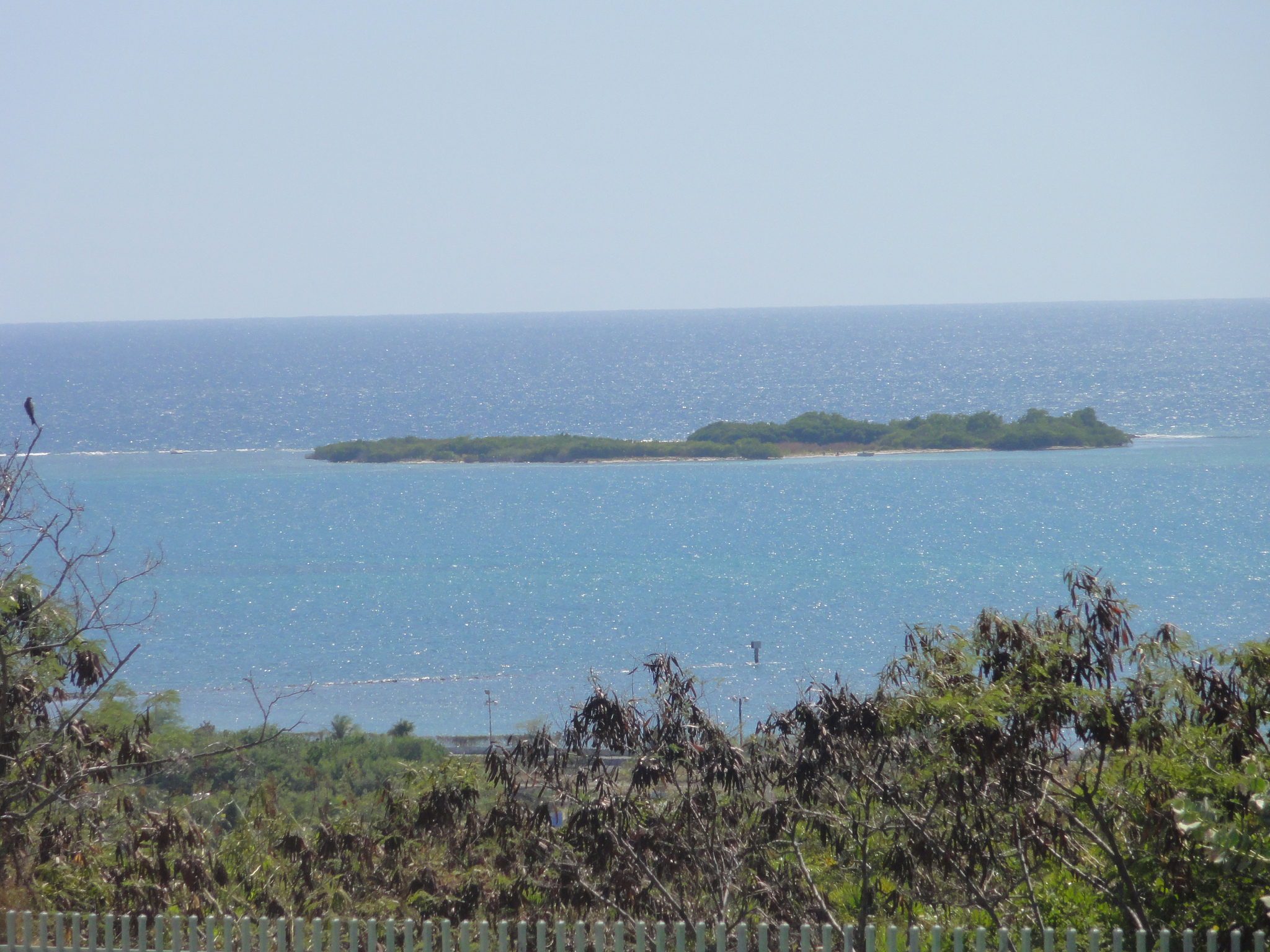
Isla de Ratones, as seen from Barrio Canas, Ponce, PR

This list of islands in Ponce, Puerto Rico, is a summary of the seven islands that form part of the municipality of Ponce, Puerto Rico. It consists of islands, keys, and cays, and similarly named geographic features surrounded by large bodies of water, namely, the Caribbean Sea.

== Island list summary table ==
No.	Name	Area	Location	Type	Comment
1	Isla de Cardona	0.04 km^{2} (9.9 acres)	Barrio Playa	Island	Also known as Isla Sor Isolina Ferré
2	Isla de Ratones	0.03 km^{2} (7.4 acres)	Barrio Canas	Island	Not to be confused with Isla de Ratones in Cabo Rojo
3	Isla del Frío	0.01 km^{2} (2.5 acres)	Barrio Vayas	Island	Administered by the Puerto Rico Department of Natural and Environmental Resources
4	Caja de Muertos	1.54 km^{2} (380 acres)	Barrio Playa	Island	Largest of the islands
5	Isla Morrillito	0.04 km^{2} (9.9 acres)	Barrio Playa	Island	A protected nature reserve; Connected to Caja de Muertos by a bank of shallow waters about 5.49 meters deep
6	Isla de Gatas	0.05 km^{2} (12 acres)	Barrio Playa	Island	Has been artificially joined to the Ponce mainland and is now occupied by Club Nautico de Ponce
7	Isla de Jueyes	0.01 km^{2} (2.5 acres)	Barrio Vayas	Island	Actually a group of three small islands

== Gallery ==
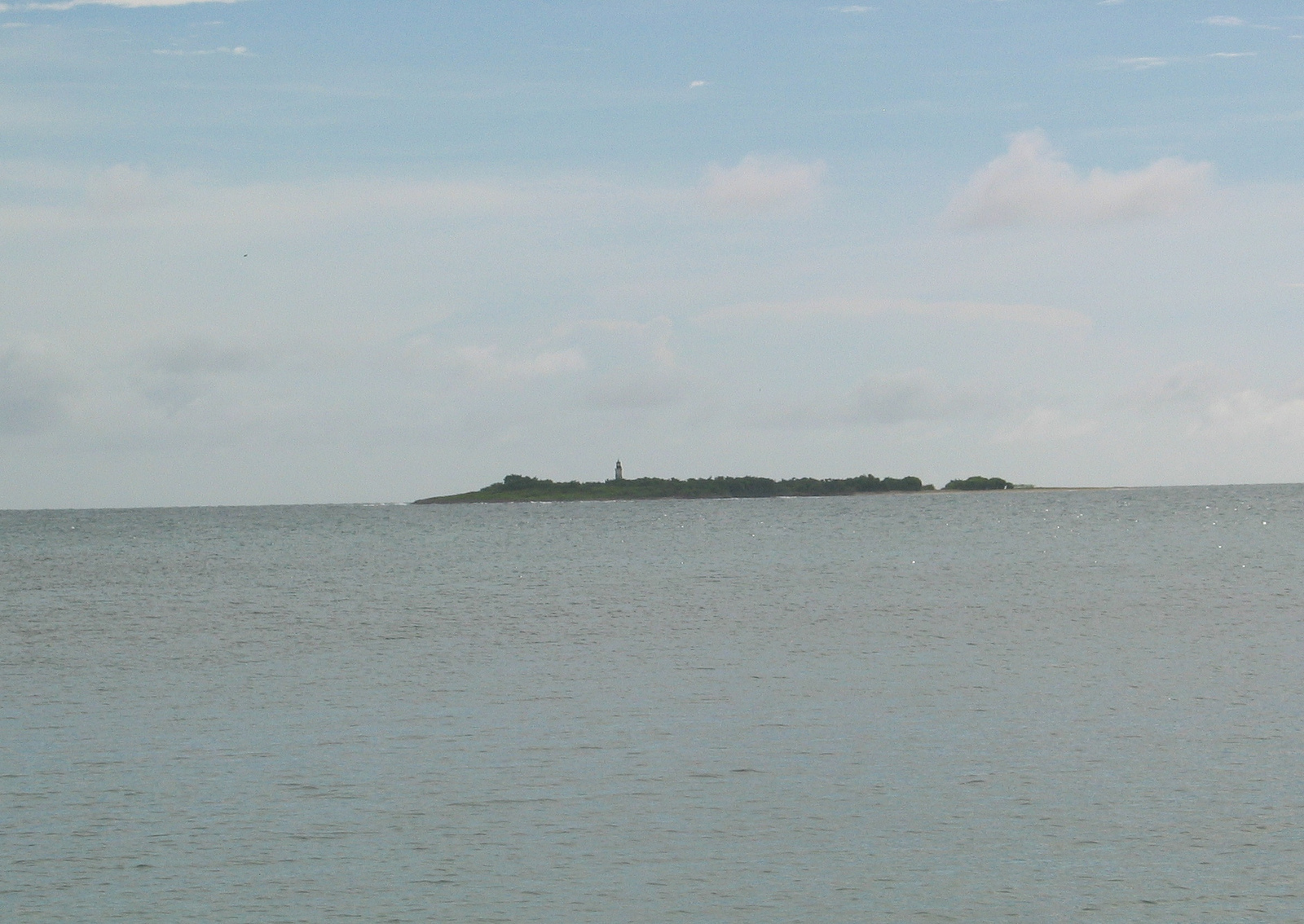
Isla de Cardona as seen from Club Náutico de Ponce

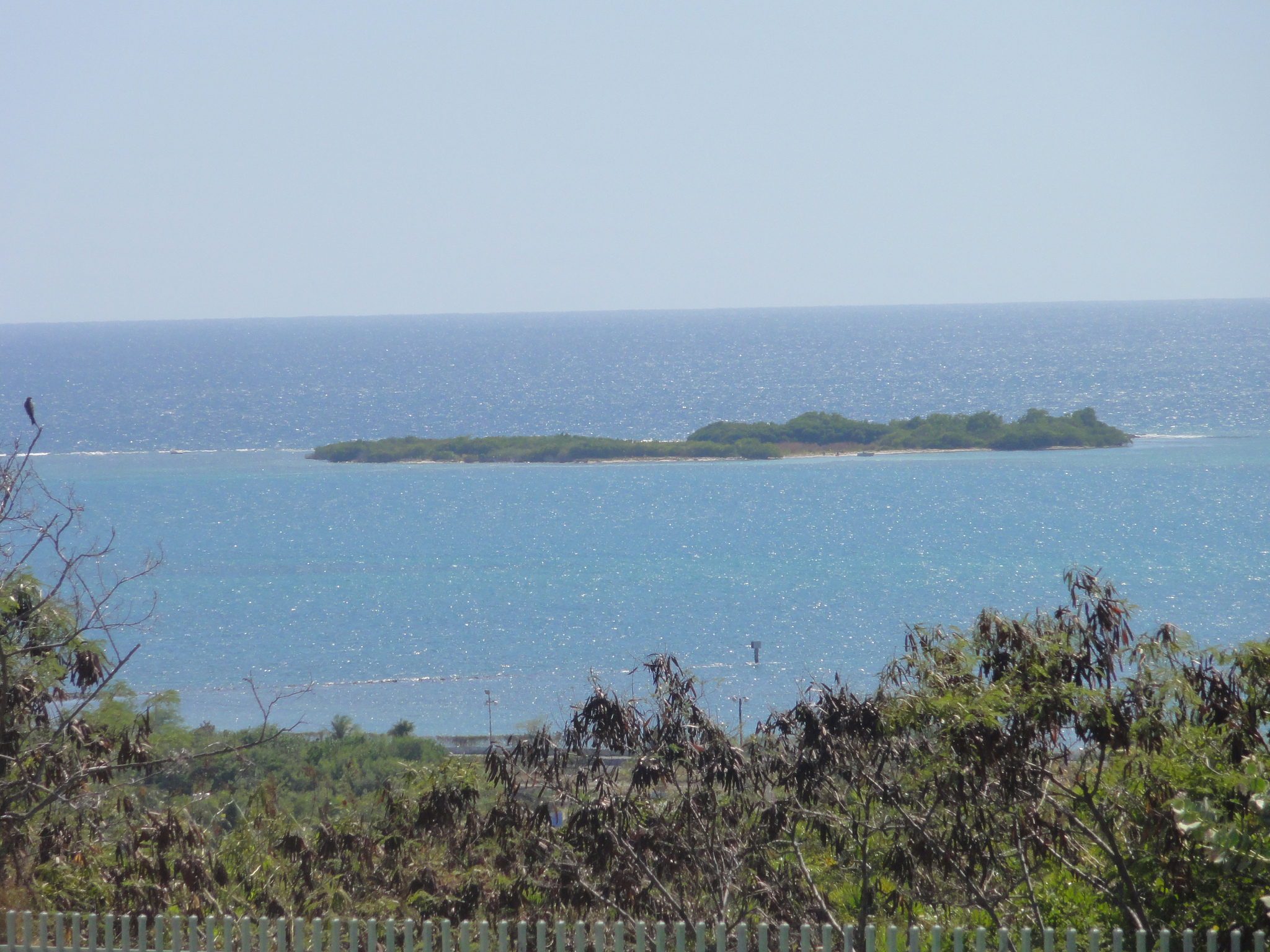
Isla Ratones as seen from Hotel Ponce Holiday Inn

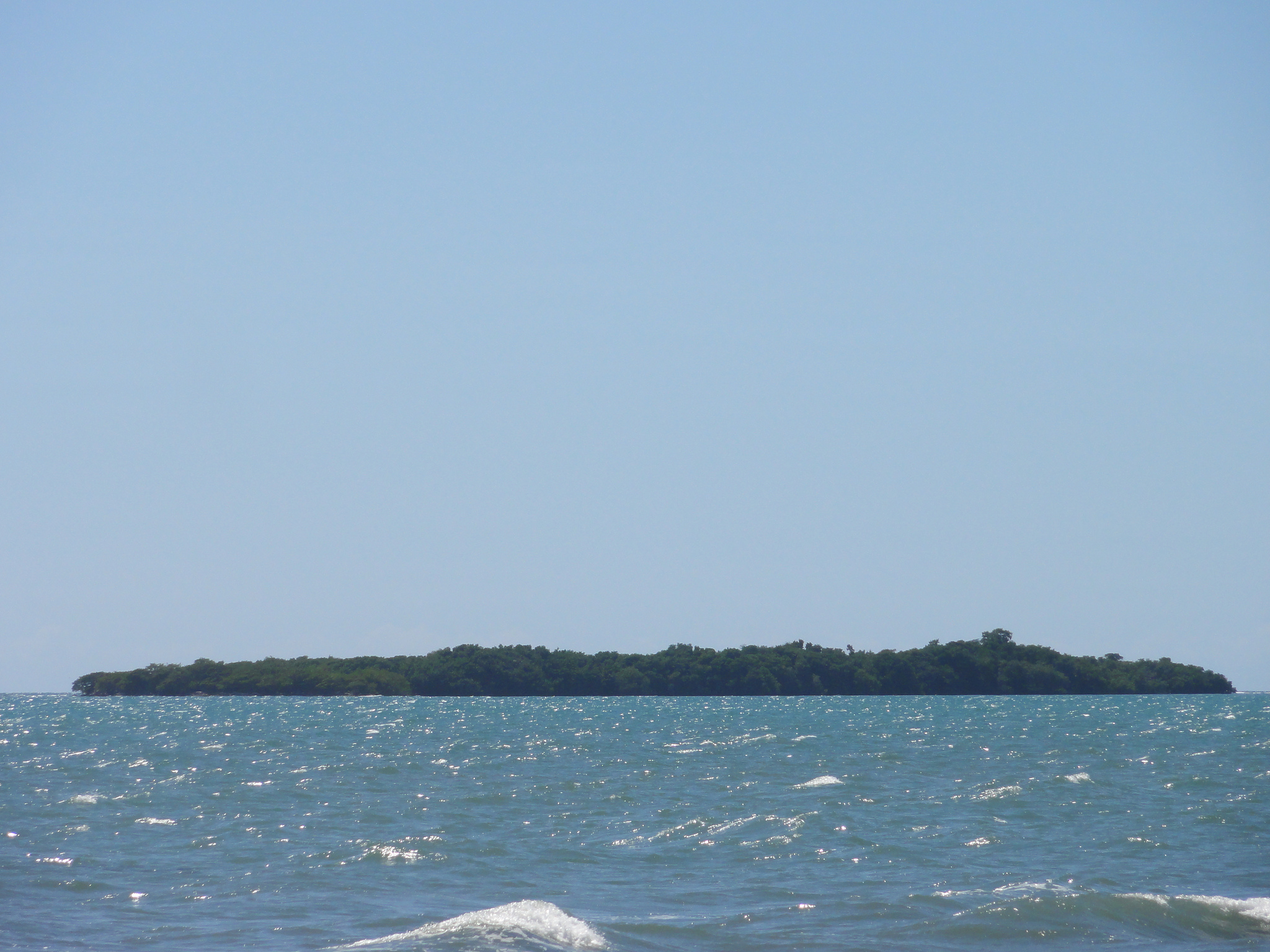
Isla del Frio as seen from the shores of Juana Diaz

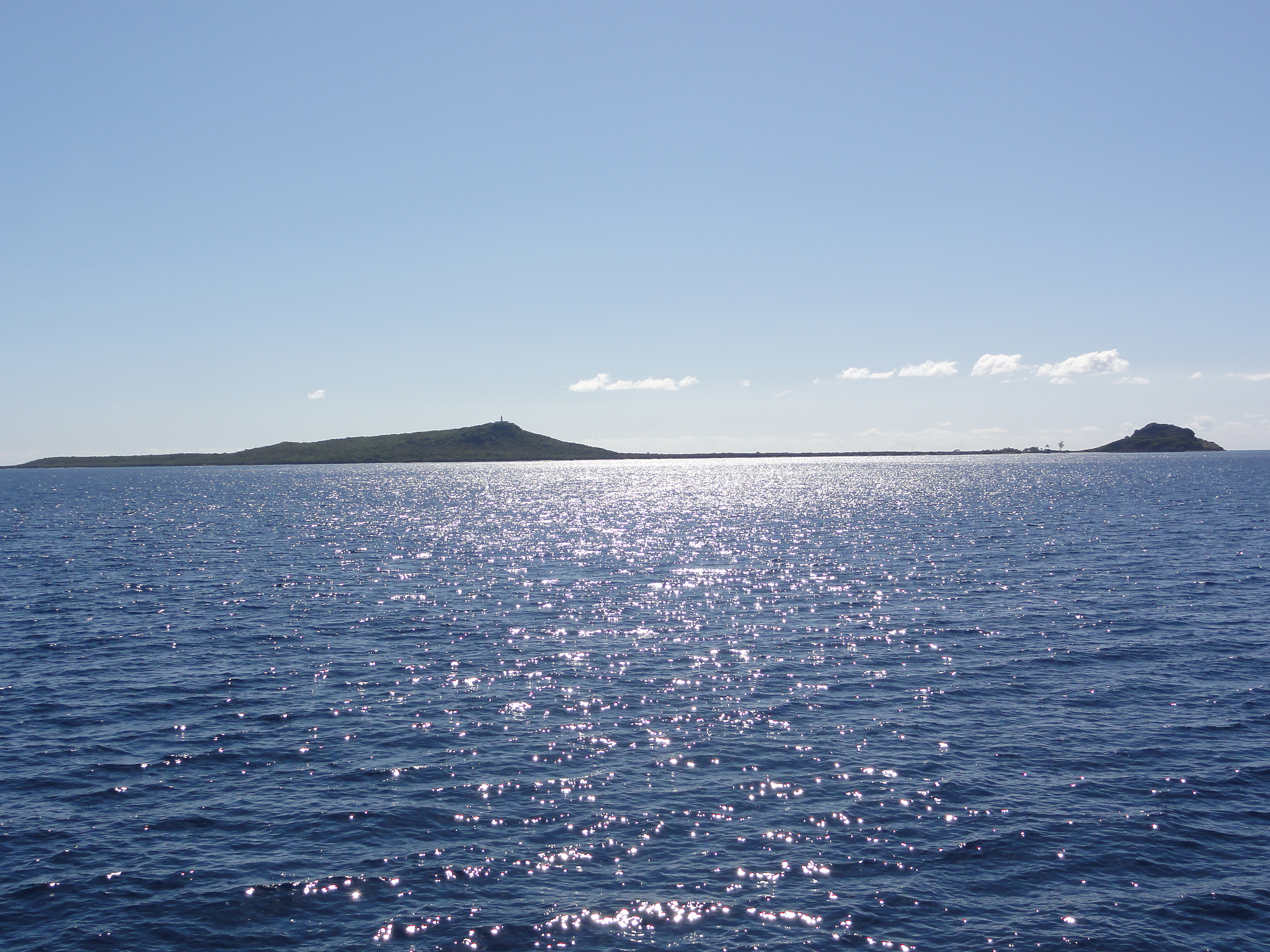
Caja de Muertos approaching from the Northwest

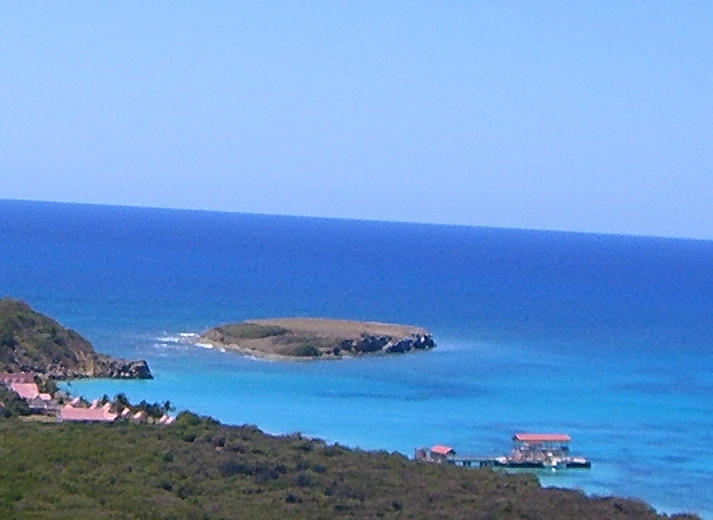
Isla Morrillito as seen from the Caja de Muertos Light

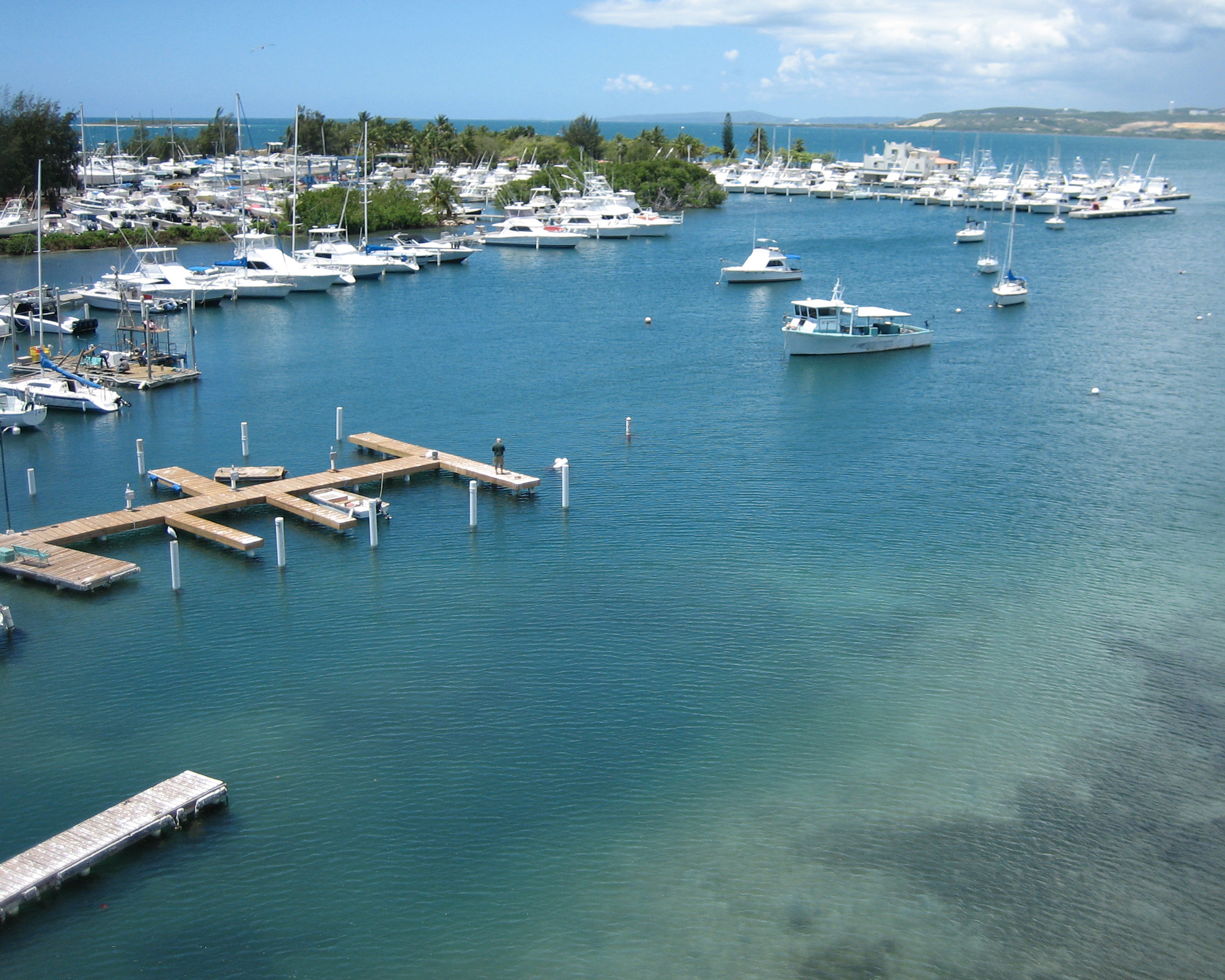
Isla de Gatas, now home to Club Náutico de Ponce

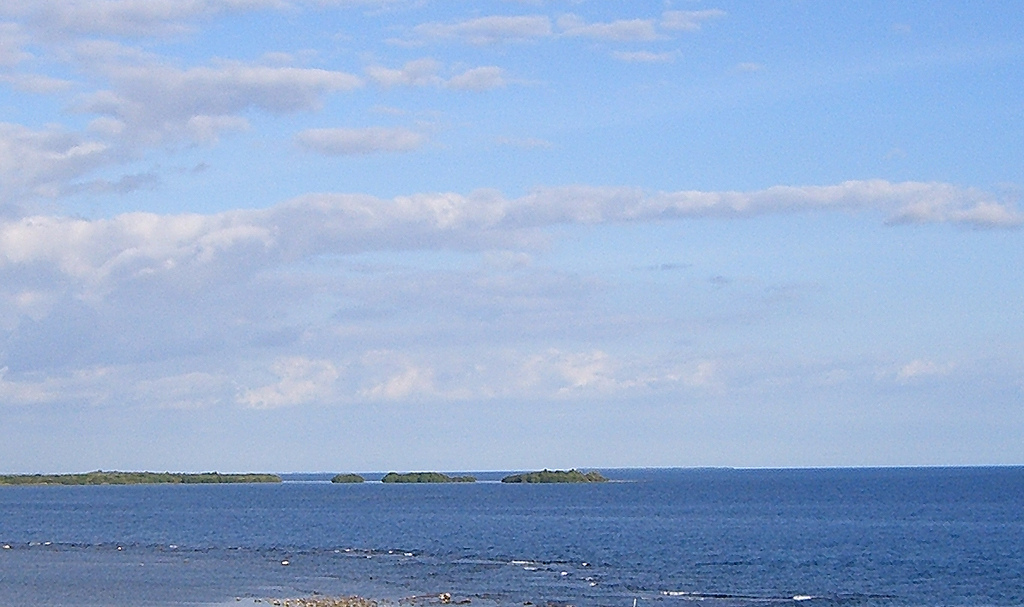
Isla de Jueyes as seen from the Observation Tower at La Guancha
