= List of beaches in Ponce, Puerto Rico =

External audio
- You may see Ponce's Playa Pelicano at Caja de Muertos HERE

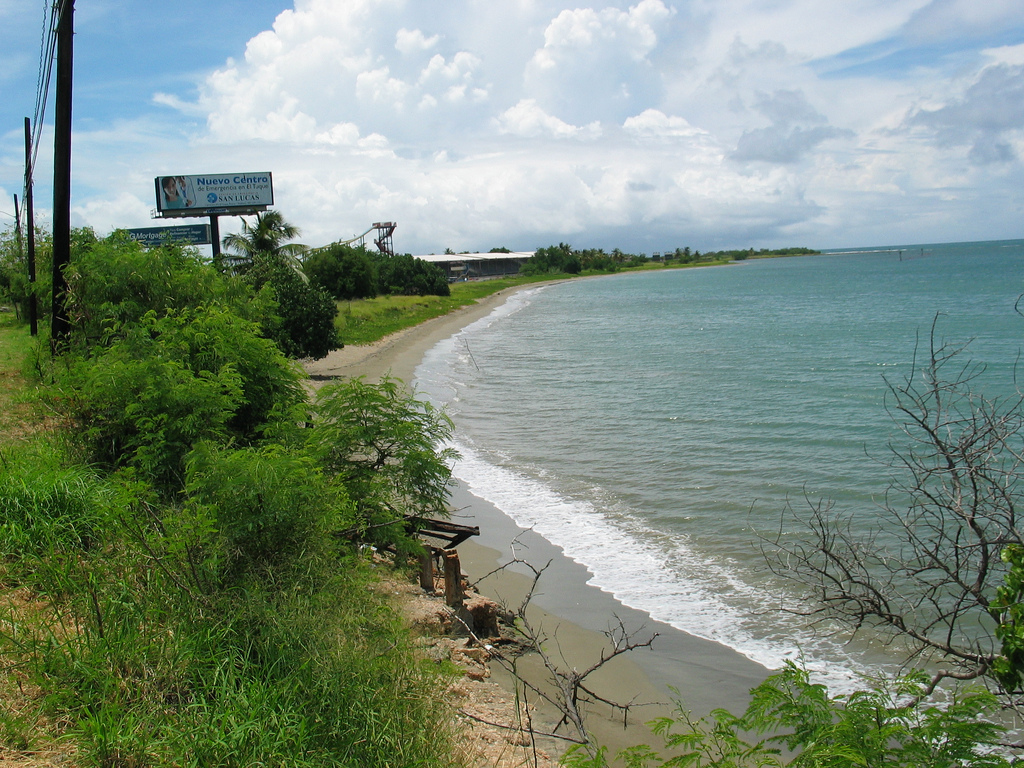
Playa El Tuque as seen from PR-2

The municipality of Ponce, Puerto Rico, has 40 beaches including 28 on the mainland and 12 in its offshore islands, primarily at the deserted island of Caja de Muertos. This list of beaches in Ponce, Puerto Rico, consists of some of the most popular beaches in the municipality of Ponce, Puerto Rico. Only natural salt-water beaches are listed.

All beaches in Ponce are public beaches and accessible to the general public at large, except for the beach at the Club Nautico de Ponce, which is accessible to members of that club only. Some public beaches are off-limits to the general public due to preservation or protection efforts. This is the case, for example, of beaches protected under the law by the Puerto Rico Department of Natural and Environmental Resources. Playa Larga beach, in Caja de Muertos, falls in this latter category. None of the beaches in Ponce is among Puerto Rico's 10 most dangerous beaches in terms of the number of drownings.

Among beaches in Ponce, a few of the most popular are El Tuque Beach in the El Tuque sector of Barrio Canas, near highway PR-2, west of the city; La Guancha Beach at the La Guancha complex south of the city; and four beaches in Caja de Muertos: Playa Pelícano beach, Playa Larga beach, Playa Carrucho beach, and Playa Blanca beach. Playa Pelicano beach was the first beach in Puerto Rico - and the entire Caribbean - to attain Blue Flag Beach status. It is also the only beach in the world part of a nature reserve that holds this recognition. Most beaches in Ponce are small secluded beaches known mostly to local people and accessed by dirt roads. They are part of a coastal stretch in southwestern Puerto Rico "filled with isolated sandy coves and virgin white beaches accessible only by dirt roads that only the locals seem to know about." While there are several family-oriented beaches, like La Guancha and El Tuque, there are also many beaches ideal for sunbathing and relaxation as well as many spots for just being alone. Some beaches are more apt for some types of activities, such as scuba diving, than other beaches. Beaches in Caja de Muertos can be reached via private boat or, during the weekends, via a daily ferry that leaves early in the mornings (reservations are required) from the La Guancha Boardwalk in Barrio Playa.

Ponce beaches are the result of mineral aggregate found in them, and this is, in turn, the result of silt carried by the Ponce river system from the mountains of Cordillera Central. In this manner the composition of its beaches are determined by the geological regions through which the nearby rivers flow. Beaches west of Ponce (El Tuque, Las Salinas, Matilde, etc.) exhibit sand that is mostly white, resulting from its calcareous content, and primarily composed of coral fragments and marine shells. Beaches east of Ponce (La Guancha, Club Nautico, Hilton, Cabuyon, Vayas, etc.) exhibit sand that is mostly dark sand with magnetite, and composed of fragments of volcanic rock, quartz, and calcareous detritus. Also, the sand at mainland Ponce beaches tends to be generally dark while in the offshore Ponce islands sand is white.

== Beach list summary table ==
=== Beaches on the Ponce mainland ===
No.	Beach Name	Length (m)	Barrio	Sector	Coordinates	Activities and Services	Notes	Image
1	El Tuque; a.k.a., Balneario El Tuque	1100	Canas	El Tuque, PR-2, at km 200.1	17°58′21″N 066°40′43″W	;;;;;;		
2	Punta Salinera	unknown	Canas	Southwest of Laguna Las Salinas on PR-2, km 200.2	17°58′1.67″N 066°40′18.37″W	;		
3	Las Salinas	unknown	Canas	South of Laguna Las Salinas on PR-2, km 200.2	17°58′07″N 066°40′00″W	;		
4	Cañas	1100	Canas	Between Punta Cucharas and the jetty just west of the Ponce water treatment plant. Accessed from PR-2 & Ave. Punto Oro, south on the asphalt, gravel, and (then) dirt road to the end.	17°58′42″N 066°39′07″W	;;		
5	Matilde (Note: While some sources may name this beach "Matilda", there is no Playa Matilda in Ponce; the correct spelling (and the one most authorities use) is "Matilde".)	unknown	Canas	South of the Ponce water treatment plant; just west of Río Matilde. Accessed from PR-2 and PR-9, heading south, following the road leading to the Ponce water treatment plant.	17°58′51″N 066°38′28″W			
6	Chencha; a.k.a., "El Tubo"	500	Playa	Between Río Matilde eastward to the breakwater at Ocean View Restaurant (Dorado St.) Accessed from PR-585, then Ave. Los Meros to the end.	17°58′55″N 066°38′11″W	;		
7	Los Meros	500	Playa	Between the breakwater at Ocean View Restaurant (Dorado St) and the Villa Pesquera fishing village piers (former mouth of Río Portugués) Accessed from PR-585, then Ave. Los Meros, then Ocean View Restaurant.	17°58′57″N 066°37′44″W	;		
8	Playa de Ponce (Note: Not to be confused with the populated neighborhood and municipal ward "Barrio Playa de Ponce".)	unknown	Playa	Between the Villa Pesquera fishing piers and the Ave. Hostos Final pier. At the southernmost tip of PR-585	17°58′51″N 066°37′23″W	;		
9	El Malecón	unknown	Playa	At Parque Pasivo Enrique Gonzalez on Calle Bonaire, two blocks south of the southernmost tip of Avenida Hostos (PR-123) in barrio Playa de Ponce	17°58′45″N 066°37′11″W		Also the Finish site of Cruce a Nado Internacional	
10	Club Náutico de Ponce	unknown	Playa	Isla de Gatas, within the Club Náutico de Ponce property, across from La Guancha Boardwalk, accessed via PR-12	17°57′49″N 066°37′10″W	;	This beach is within the area of Club Nautico de Ponce, a private club	
11	La Guancha; a.k.a. Playa Carenero	850	Playa	La Guancha Recreational and Cultural Complex, at the southernmost tip of PR-12 (Avenida Santiago de los Caballeros)	17°57′50″N 066°36′43″W	;;;		
12	Playa del Hilton	unknown	Playa	Hotel Ponce Hilton, west of Río Bucaná, accessible through Hilton Ponce Golf and Casino Resort, PR-12 South to Avenida Caribe	17°58′10″N 066°36′08″W	;;		
13	Punta Cabuyón; a.k.a., Playa Punta Cabullones.	325	Vayas	Just west of Punta de Cabullones, accessed from Barrio Bucana by way of Santa Cruz community (becomes a dirt road).	17°58′15″N 066°35′38″W	;;	A nature reserve since 31 December 2016.	
14	Vayas	2200	Vayas	Area of Quinta Esperanza, across from Cayo Desgraciado, accessed from PR-1 to Calle La Esperanza to the end (becomes a dirt road).	17°58′1″N 066°34′08″W	;;		

=== Beaches at offshore Ponce islands ===
No.	Beach Name	Length (m)	Barrio	Sector	Coordinates	Activities and Services	Notes	Image
				Beaches at Isla de Ratones				
15	Isla de Ratones	unknown	Canas	At Isla de Ratones, accessed by kayak from Reserva Natural Punta Cucharas or by boat via boat ramp at marina just west of Punta Cucharas sector on PR-2	17°57′08″N 066°40′51″W	;;		
				Beaches at Isla Cardona				
16	Isla Cardona	unknown	Playa	At Isla Cardona, accessed by kayak or boat	17°57′28″N 066°38′11″W	;	Also the Start site of Cruce a Nado Internacional	
				Beaches at Caja de Muertos				
17	Pelícano	300	Playa	Caja de Muertos; located on the western (docking) side of the island, between the boat dock and Cerro Morrillo, accessed by ferry from La Guancha Boardwalk	17°53′08″N 066°31′41″W	;;;;;;;;		
18	Guardia Costanera	unknown	Playa	Caja de Muertos; located on the northwest side of the island (facing the city of Ponce), northwest of the Caja de Muertos Light, accessed by ferry from La Guancha Boardwalk	17°53′45″N 066°40′43″W	;;;;		
19	Blanca	unknown	Playa	Caja de Muertos; located on the northwest side of the island (facing the city of Ponce), northwest of the Caja de Muertos Light., accessed by ferry from La Guancha Boardwalk	17°53′56″N 066°31′12″W	;;;;		
20	Carrucho a.k.a., Playa Chica	unknown	Playa	Caja de Muertos; located on Punta Carrucho, at the northeast end the island, facing the Puerto Rico mainland, accessed by ferry from La Guancha Boardwalk	17°54′09″N 066°30′46″W	;;;;		
21	Ensenadita a.k.a., Playa Pocitas	unknown	Playa	Caja de Muertos, located on the southeastern side of the island, facing the open Caribbean Sea. Accessed by ferry from La Guancha Boardwalk	17°53′38″N 066°30′54″W	;;;;		
22	Larga	unknown	Playa	Caja de Muertos, located on the south-southeast side of the island, accessed by ferry from La Guancha Boardwalk	17°53′08″N 066°31′38″W	;;;;	Vereda Submarina; offshore-based snorkeling and scuba allowed. A protected beach (i.e., no foot traffic) located on the southeastern side of the island between Cerro Morrillo and Caja de Muertos Light (the side facing the open Caribbean Sea).	

KEY:

Activities Permitted:

- Swimming
- Snorkeling
- Scuba Diving
- Surfing
- Boating
- Camping
- Hiking
- Picnicking
- Fishing
- Sunbathing
- Lookout tower

Services Provided:

- Visitor Center
- Lifeguards
- Restrooms
- Children's Playground

International Recognitions Attained:

- Blue Flag beach

== Gallery ==
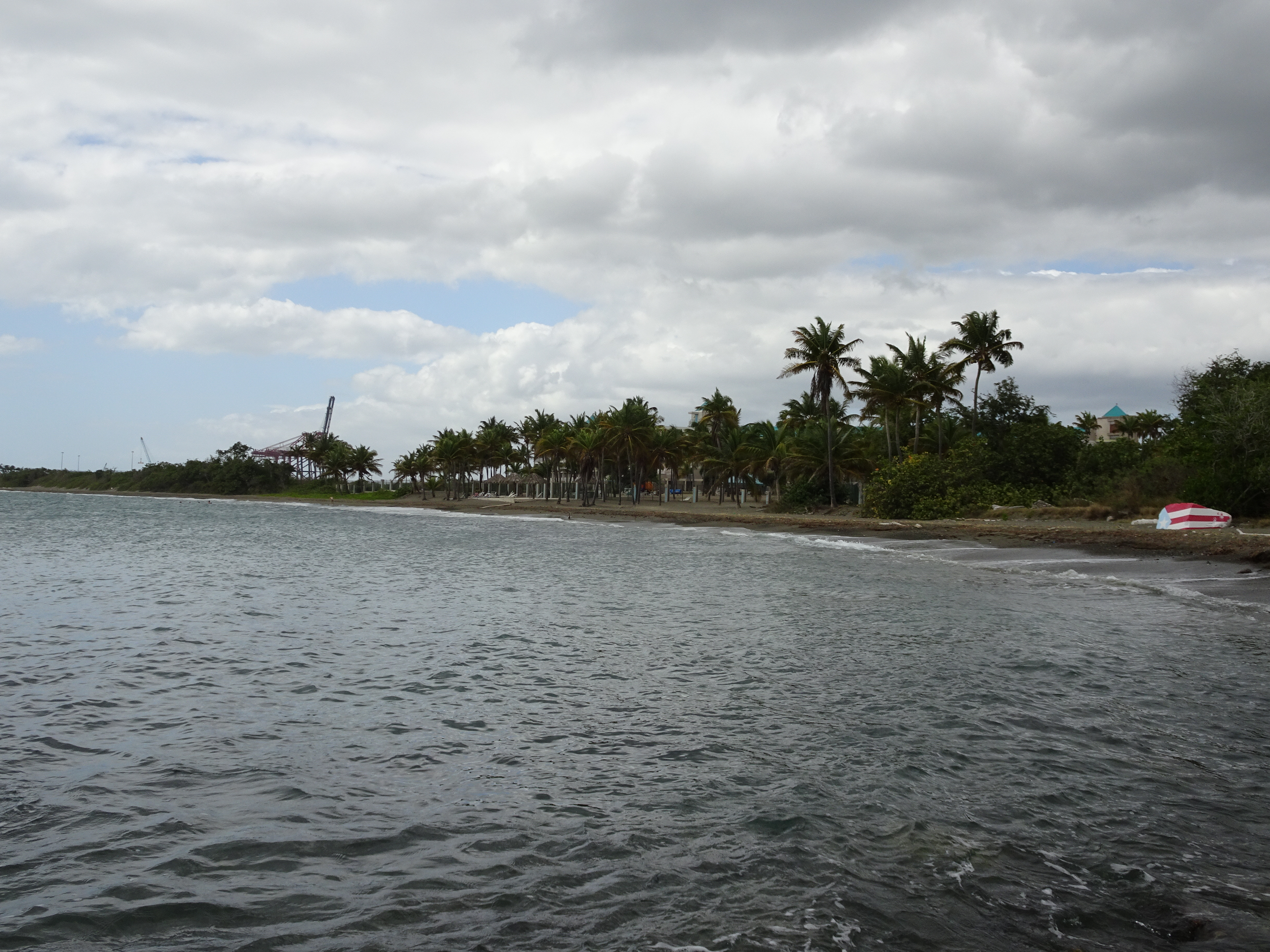
Beach at the Ponce Hilton Hotel, looking west

== See also ==
- Puerto Rico Tourism Company
- Porta Caribe
