= Gata =

Gata or GATA may refer to:

== Geography ==
- Gtaʼ language (alternate spelling Gata)
- Gata, Cape Verde, a village the island of Boa Vista, Cape Verde
- Gata, Croatia, a village in Dalmatia, Croatia
- Cabo de Gata, a cape in Spain
- Cape Gata, a cape on Cyprus
- Gata de Gorgos, a municipality in the province of Alicante, Valencian Community, Spain
- Sierra de Gata, a mountainous region of Spain
  - Sierra de Gata (comarca), in Cáceres Province, Extremadura, Spain
  - Gata, Extremadura, a municipality in the comarca
- Gatas (Ponce), a Puerto Rican island off the southern coast of Puerto Rico in the municipality of Ponce

== People ==
- Gata, a diminutive of the Russian female name Agata (a variant of "Agatha")
- Gata Kamsky (born 1974), Tatar-American chess player
- Soakimi Gatafahefa (1838–1896), also known as Gata, the first Roman Catholic priest from Polynesia
- GaTa (Davionte Ganter), American rapper & actor

== Other uses ==
- Gata (food), an Armenian pastry
- GATA, a Tokyo-based online magazine on underground cinema
- GATA transcription factor
- Glu-AdT subunit A, part of the enzyme Glu-AdT
- Gata (weapon), or Gata waka, a gunstock war club of Fiji
- "Gata", a song of 6ix9ine and Lil AK
- Gülhane Military Medical Academy (GATA), former name of a hospital located in Turkey

== See also ==
- Gold Anti-Trust Action Committee (GATAC)
- Gatas (disambiguation)
- Gaeta (disambiguation)
- La Gata (disambiguation)
