= Gatas =

Gatas can refer to:

- Gatas (Ponce), a Puerto Rican island off the southern coast of Puerto Rico in the municipality of Ponce
- Gatas Brilhantes H.P., a Japanese futsal club
- Gatas Parlament (Parliament of the Street), a Norwegian group of rap artists
- Baía das Gatas, a bay in São Vicente Island, Cape Verde
- Praia das Gatas, a beach in Boa Vista Island, Cape Verde
- Ongaku Gatas, a Japanese girl group

== See also ==
- Gata (disambiguation)
