= La Gata =

La Gata (lit. 'The Cat') may refer to:

== Film ==
- La gata (1947 film) or The Cat, an Argentine drama film
- La gata (1956 film) or The Cat, a French-Spanish film

== Television ==
- La Gata (1970 TV series), a Mexican telenovela
- La Gata (2014 TV series) or The Stray Cat, a Mexican telenovela; a remake of a 1968 Venezuelan telenovela

== Other uses ==
- La Gata (bar), a lesbian bar in Frankfurt, Germany

== See also ==
- The Cat (disambiguation)
- Gata (disambiguation)
