= Gaeta (disambiguation) =

Gaeta is the city and comune on the western coast of Italy.

Gaeta may also refer to:

- Gulf of Gaeta, a body of water in the Tyrrhenian Sea named after the city.
- Siege of Gaeta (disambiguation), any of five sieges of the city of Gaeta between 1707 and 1860.
- Duke of Gaeta, a title of nobility associated with the city of Gaeta.
- Gaeta, Queensland, a locality in the Bundaberg Region, Queensland, Australia

== People ==
- Antonio Gaeta (b. 1984), Italian footballer
- John Gaeta, American visual effects artist

== Other ==
- Gaeta class minehunter, a class of eight minehunters operated by the Marina Militare (Italian Navy).
- Felix Gaeta, a character from the 2004 science-fiction television series Battlestar Galactica.
- Beansie Gaeta, a fictional character from the television series The Sopranos
