= Grand Prix de Ponce =

Auto race held at the Ponce Speedway in Puerto Rico

American GT Series, Marlboro GT de las Americas
- Venue: Ponce Speedway
- Corporate sponsor: Ponce Grand Prix, Inc.
- First race: 1993
- Last race: 2012
- Distance: 300 miles (483 km)
- Laps: 200
- Previous names: Grand Prix Marlboro, Marlboro GT de las Americas

The Grand Prix de Ponce is an auto race held at the Ponce Speedway in the El Tuque sector of barrio Canas, Ponce, Puerto Rico. The yearly event started in 1993. Before the construction of the Speedway, the race took place in the area of La Guancha in barrio Playa in Ponce. The new speedway opened in 2003.

== History ==
The Grand Prix Marlboro de Ponce first started in 1993, taking place in Puerto Rico's historic and second largest city. The 60,000 fans attending provided the momentum to continue celebrating the races.

== Location ==
Today's Grand Prix de Ponce takes place in Ponce at El Tuque, a beach, speedway and marina complex just west of Ponce. The new speedway venue is called the Ponce International Speedway Park and opened in 2003. It includes a drag-racing track and circuit track.

== Winners ==
=== GT Marlboro de las Américas 1993 ===
The 1993 winners were:

VIII Championship GT Marlboro de Las Américas, Grand Prix de Ponce, 3 October 1993.

- GTS: (46) Adriano Abreu, Oldomobile Cutlass.
- GTU: (85) Tony Canahuate, Porsche 911.

=== GT Marlboro de las Américas 1994 ===
The 1994 winners were:

V Championship GT Marlboro de Las Américas, Ponce Grand Prix. 2 October 2012:

- GTS: (35) Armando Mandy-González (Puerto Rico), Chevrolet Camaro.

VI Championship GT Marlboro de Las Américas, Ponce Grand Prix. October 1994.

- GTS: (35) Armando Mandy-González / Manolo Villa (Puerto Rico), Chevrolet Camaro.

IX Championship GT Marlboro de Las Américas. 8 December 1994.

- GTS: (46) Adriano Abreu, Chevrolet Camaro.
- GTU: (19) Peter Moodie (Trinidad & Tobago), Mazda RX-7.

GT Marlboro de Las Américas Champions:

- GTS: (98) Wally Castro / Rolando Falgueras (Puerto Rico), Ford Mustang Cobra, with 118 pts.
- GTU: (44) Paco Aponte (Puerto Rico), Mazda RX-7, with 128 pts.

=== GT Marlboro de las Américas 1995 ===
The 1995 winners were:

VI Championship GT Marlboro de Las Américas, Grand Prix de Ponce, October 1995.

- GTS: (35) Armando Mandy-González / Manolo Villa (Puerto Rico), Chevrolet Camaro.
