= Siege of Gaeta =

The siege of Gaeta can refer to several historical sieges of the city of Gaeta in Italy:

- Siege of Gaeta (1435), siege by Alfonso V of Aragon against a Genoese garrison
- Siege of Gaeta (1707), Austrian attack during the War of the Spanish Succession
- Siege of Gaeta (1734), French and Spanish attack during the War of the Polish Succession
- Siege of Gaeta (1806), French attack during the War of the Third Coalition of the Napoleonic Wars
- Siege of Gaeta (1815), Austrian attack during the Neapolitan War
- Siege of Gaeta (1860), Piedmontese attack during the Italian Unification Wars
