= Morrillito =

Uninhabited island of Puerto Rico

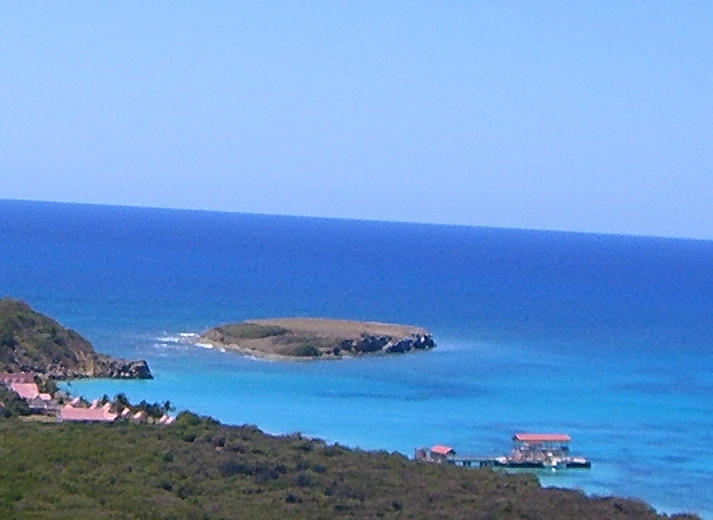
- Isla Morrillito, looking south from the Caja de Muertos Light

- Location within Puerto Rico Location within Lesser Antilles Location within the Caribbean

Geography
- Location: Ponce, Puerto Rico
- Coordinates: 17°52′56″N 66°31′59″W
- Area: 0.04 km^{2} (0.015 sq mi)

Administration
- Puerto Rico
- Commonwealth: Puerto Rico
- Municipality: Ponce
- Barrio: Playa

Demographics
- Population: 0
- Pop. density: 0/km^{2} (0/sq mi)

Morrillito is a small uninhabited island off the southern coast of Puerto Rico. The island is protected by the Reserva Natural Caja de Muertos natural reserve because of its native turtle traffic. Together with Caja de Muertos, Gatas, Ratones, Cardona, Isla del Frio, and Isla de Jueyes, Morrillito is one of seven islands ascribed to the municipality of Ponce.

== Location ==
The island, sometimes erroneously termed a key (or, cay), is located 5.2 mi (8.4 km) south of the Puerto Rican mainland and is part of Barrio Playa ward of the Ponce, Puerto Rico, municipality. It is located 590 feet (180 meters) off the southwest point of Caja de Muertos island and has an area of just 0.015 square miles (0.039 km^{2}). The island is connected to Caja de Muertos by a bank of shallow waters about 18.0 feet (5.5 meters) deep. It is located at latitude 17.88417 and longitude -66.53361. Its length is 0.31 miles (0.50 kilometers) northeast and southwest.

== Geography and climate ==
The island is a small 31-foot flat-topped island located 200 yards off the southwestern tip of Caja de Muertos and, when viewed from a distance, Morrillito can easily be mistaken for the 170-ft steep hill (called Cerro Morrillo, Morrillo Hill) at the extreme southwestern portion of Caja de Muertos proper. The climate is dry and the island supports a dry forest.

== Natural reserve ==
Together with Caja de Muertos (0.59 square miles (1.5 km^{2}) and Berberia Key (0.12 square miles (0.31 km^{2}), Morrillito makes up the Caja de Muertos Natural Reserve. The island was designated as a nature reserve in 1980 after a meeting was held in Puerto Rico by the Puerto Rico Planning Board wherein they considered the recommendation set forth by the Coastal Management Zone Program to turn the island into a protected wilderness area. The island has remained a protected area ever since. The protection is mainly due to its heavy Hawksbill sea turtle traffic which is an endangered species.

== See also ==
- Fauna of Puerto Rico
