= Club Náutico de Ponce =

Yacht club in Ponce, Puerto Rico

Coordinates: 17°57′49.10″N 66°37′04.99″W

- Burgee of Club Náutico de Ponce
- Full name: Ponce Yacht and Fishing Club
- Short name: Club Náutico
- Founded: 1 July 1941
- Location: Ponce, Puerto Rico
- Website: Website

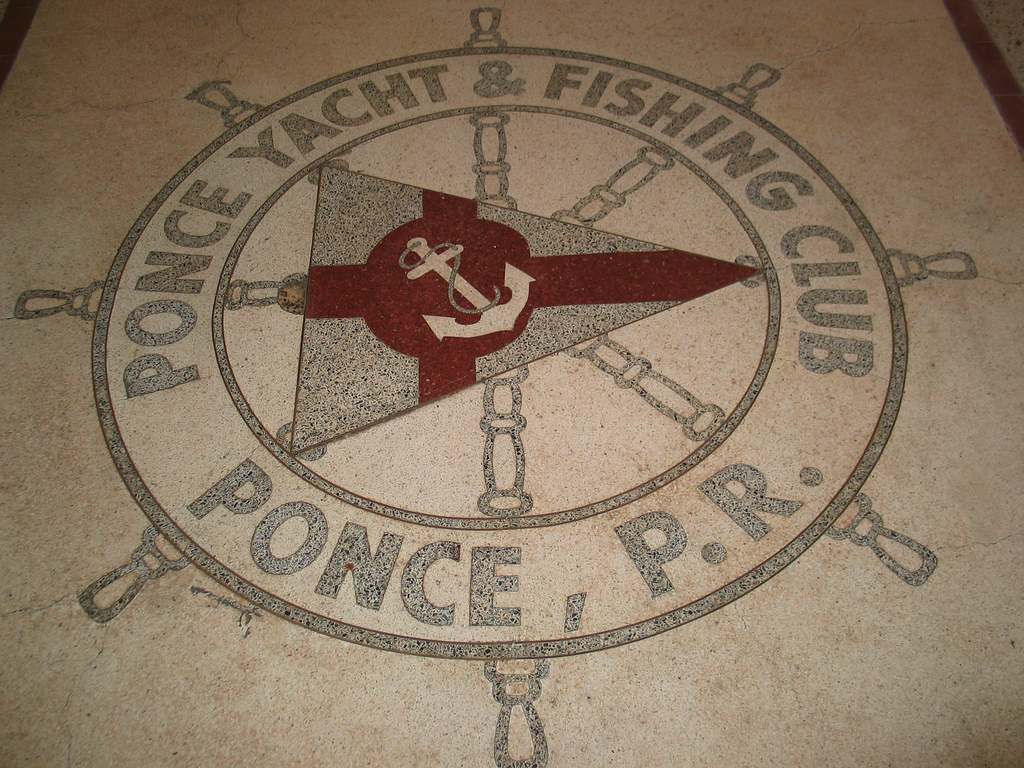
Club's emblem.

The Club Náutico de Ponce (Ponce Yacht and Fishing Club) is a yacht club in Ponce, Puerto Rico. The club is located contiguously on Isla de Gatas, near the La Guancha recreational and cultural area, and next to the Port of Ponce.

The complex consists of two restaurants, a private beach, a gym, a running track, two pools, various basketball, tennis, and volleyball courts, and a marina. The club also runs a sailing school for children. Founded in 1941 by a group of nautical enthusiasts from Ponce to promote water and fishing sports, the marina is one of Puerto Rico's oldest.

== History ==
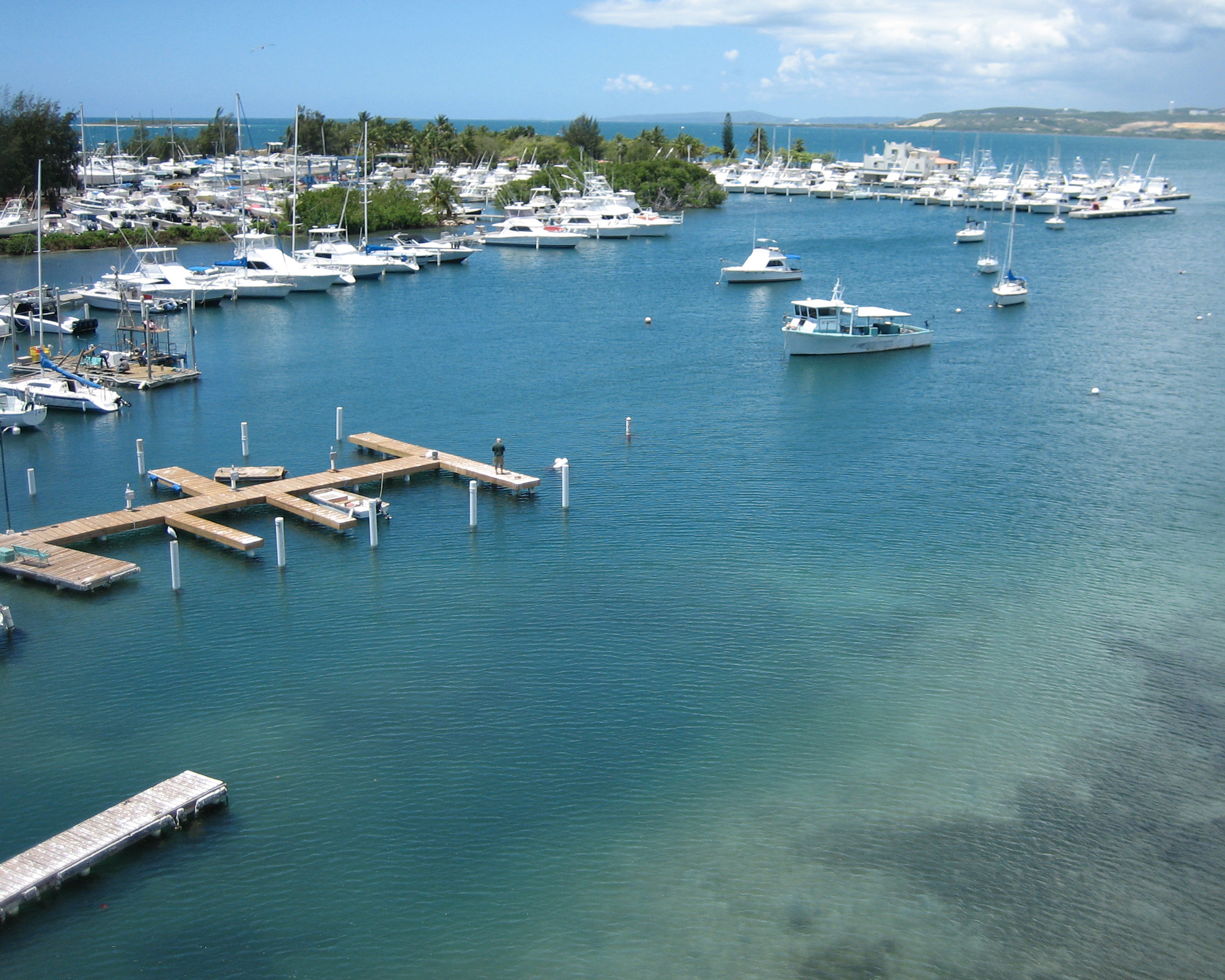
Club Náutico de Ponce looking southwest

The idea of building a Club in Isla de Gatas began in 1935 by seven men, among them Pedro Juan Serralles Galiano. At that time the island had an area of approximately 1-acre (0.40 ha) and people had to take a small boat to reach it. The clubhouse was finished in 1938, and over the years the original 1 acre was expanded to 13 acres (5.3 ha), in part due to club member Tito Castro. Mr. Castro owned a construction company and the surplus rocks that were removed from various road and construction projects that he contracted for were deposited around Isla de Gatas and eventually filled the shallow surrounding it. Isla de Gatas is connected to the mainland by a dike at Punta Carenero.

In later years the U.S. Army Corps of Engineers built a breakwater protecting the area. This, and the Tito Castro land reclamations, made it possible to build a road that joined the island to the mainland.

During World War II the club was used by the U.S. Navy who had five PT Boats stationed there. Since 1946 membership has grown from 100 people to over 900 families in 2006. The original two-story clubhouse is now a restaurant called "El Comodoro" (The Commodore). Club Náutico has room for 250 boat slips.

== Gallery ==
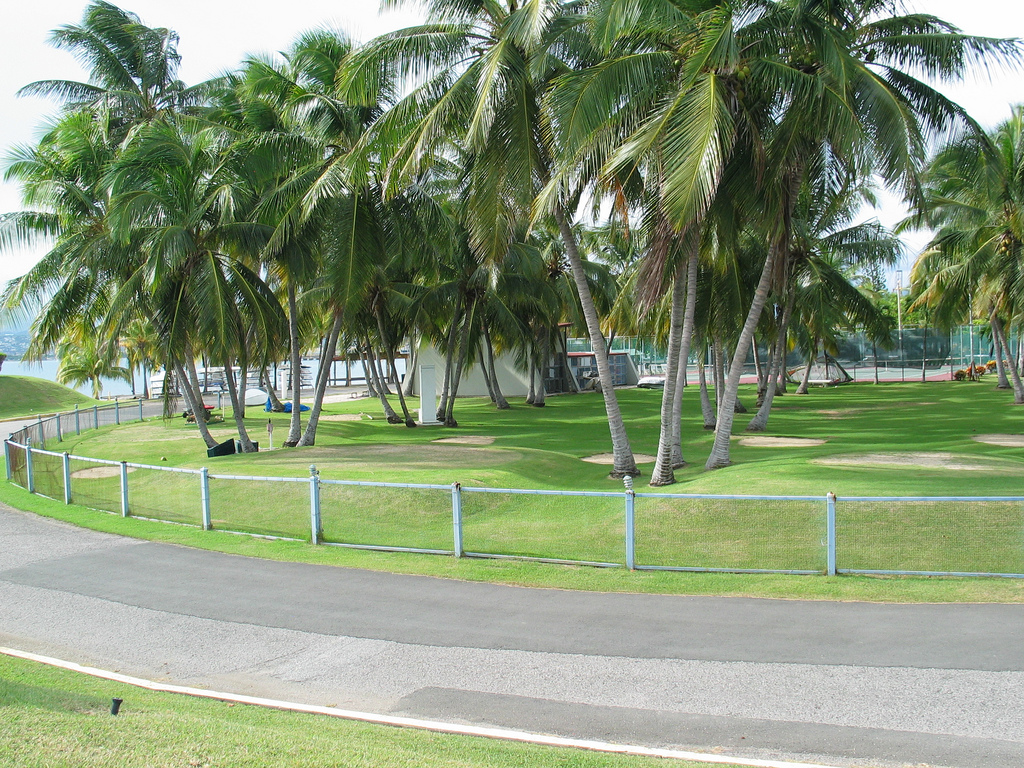
Golf Course at Club Nautico de Ponce

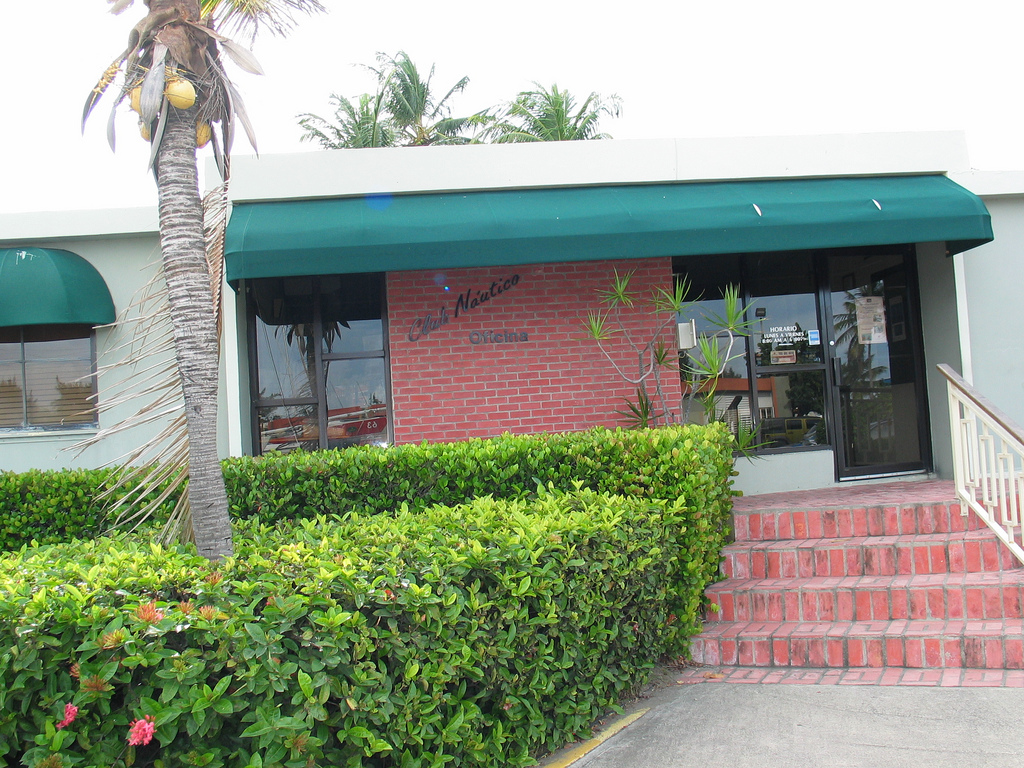
Clubhouse Office at Club Nautico de Ponce

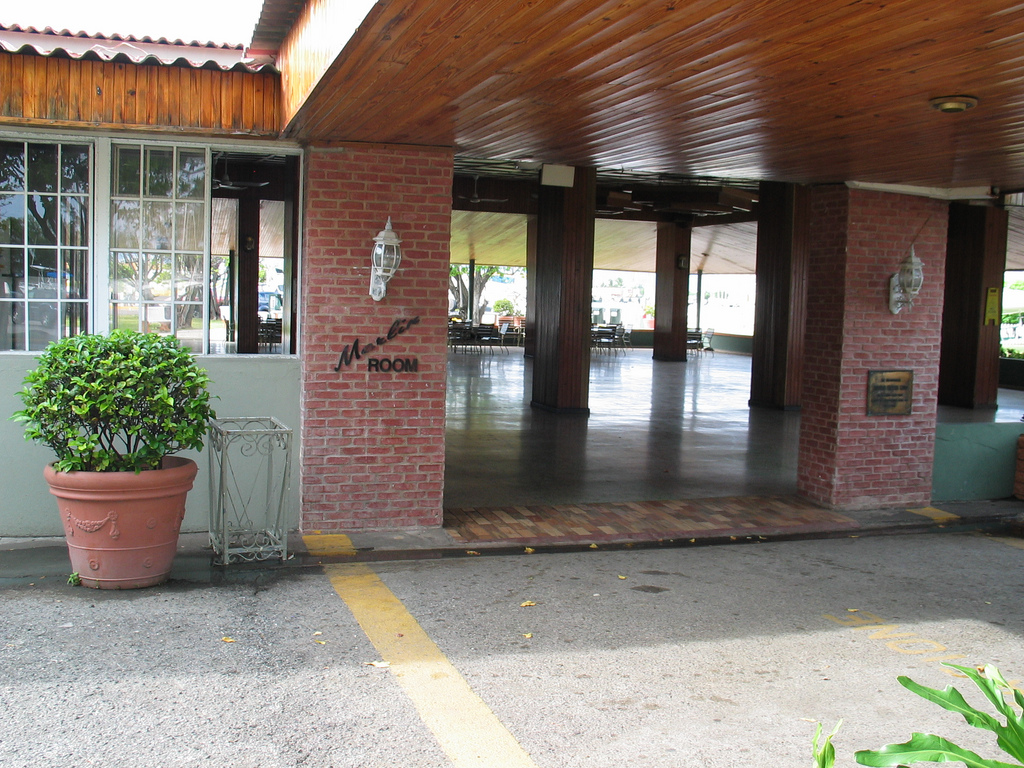
A Multi-use room at Club Nautico de Ponce

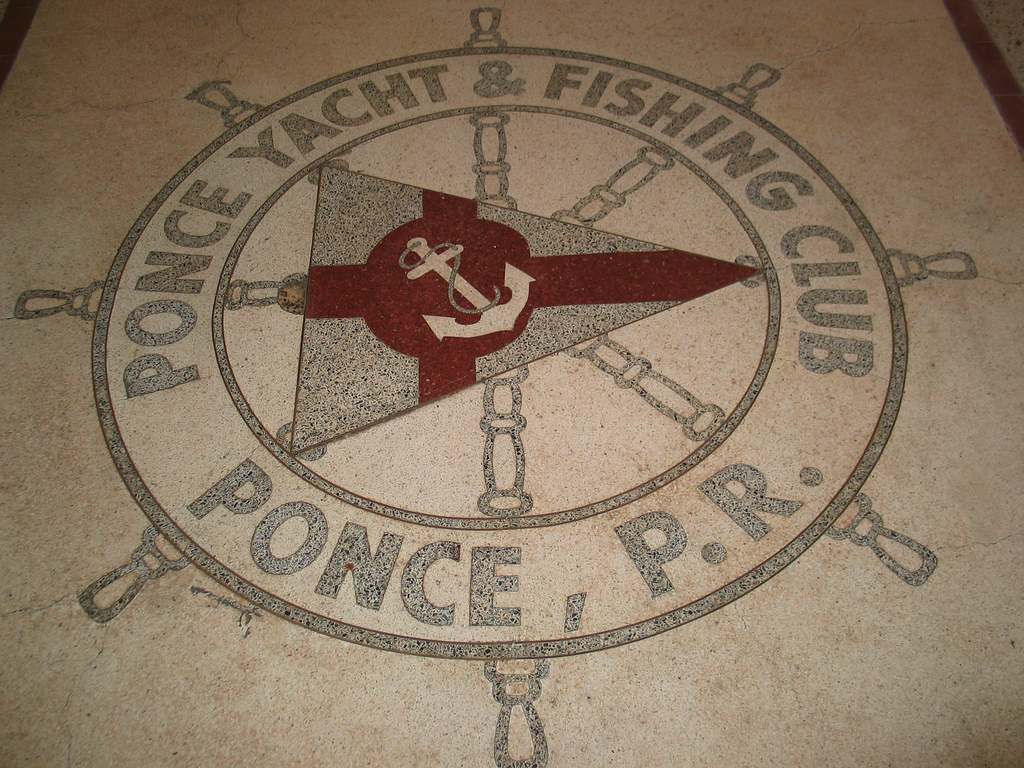
Logo of Club Nautico de Ponce

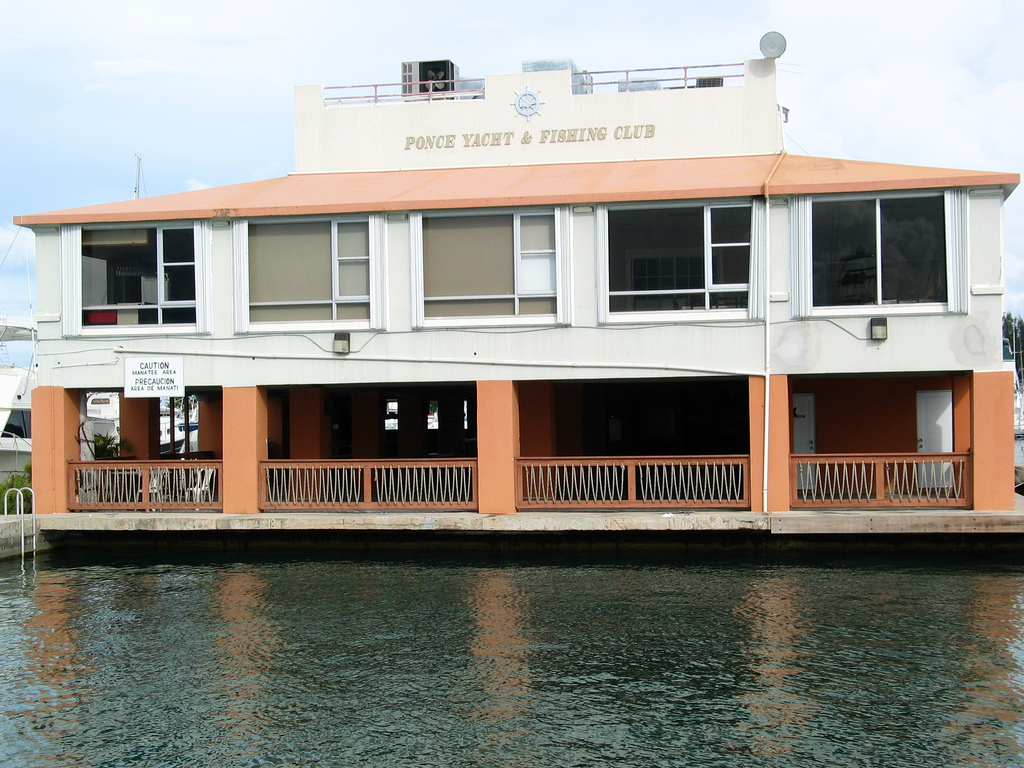
Club Nautico de Ponce Docking Area Restaurant

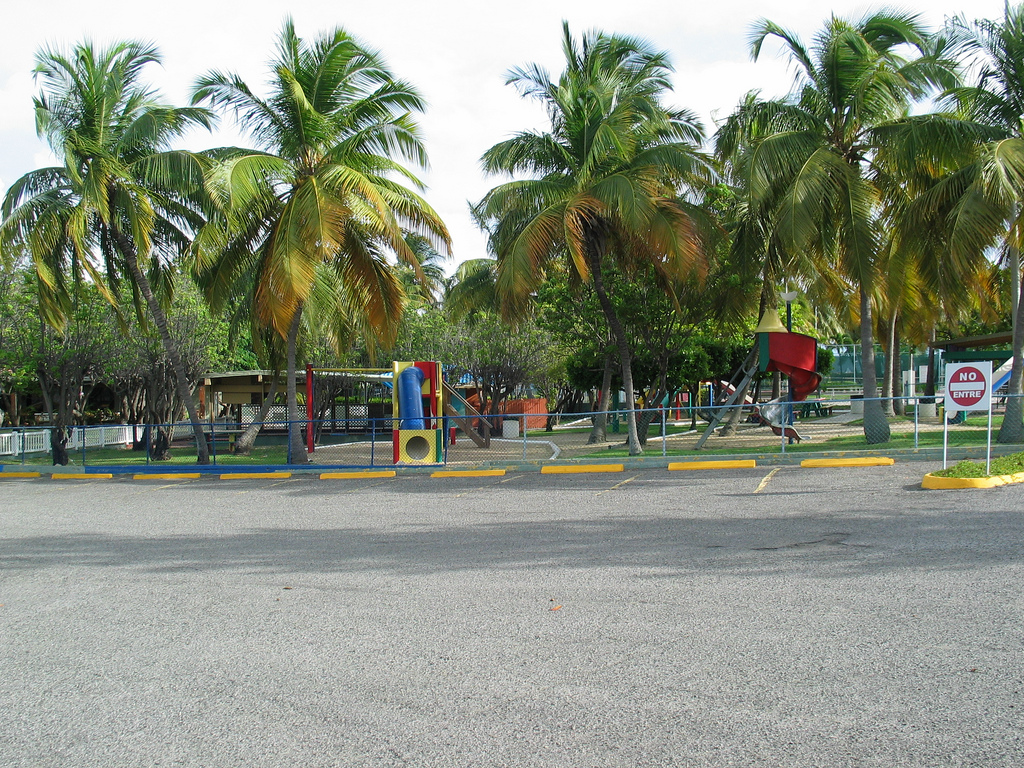
Children's Play Area at Club Nautico de Ponce

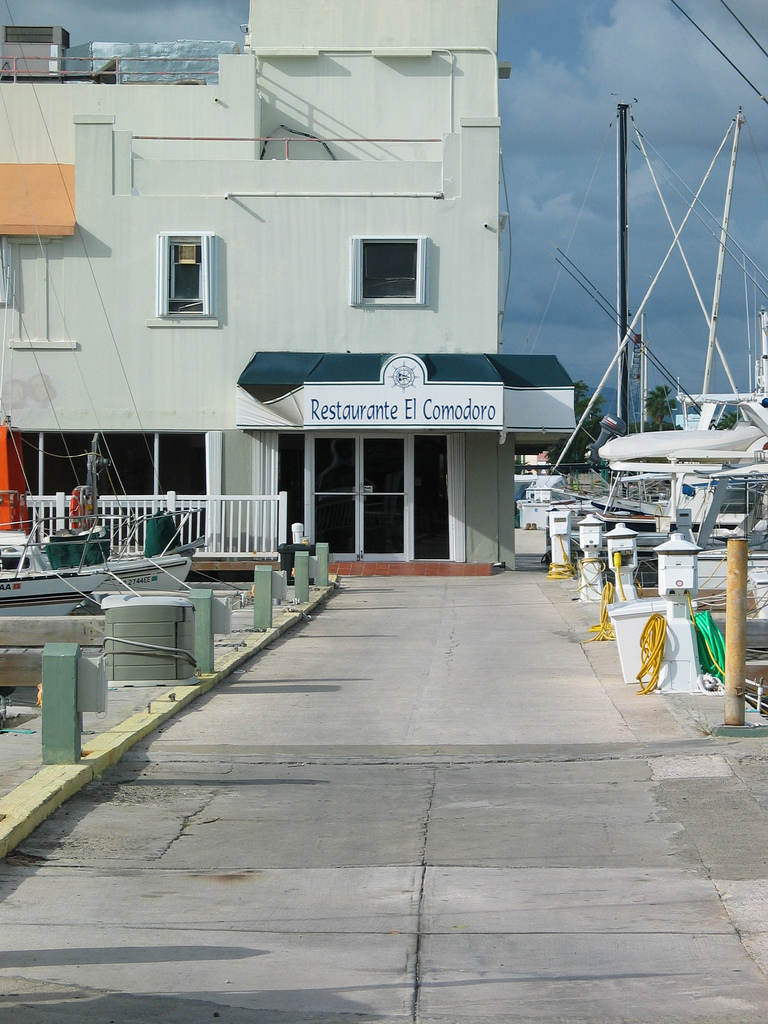
Entrance to Club Nautico de Ponce docking area restaurant

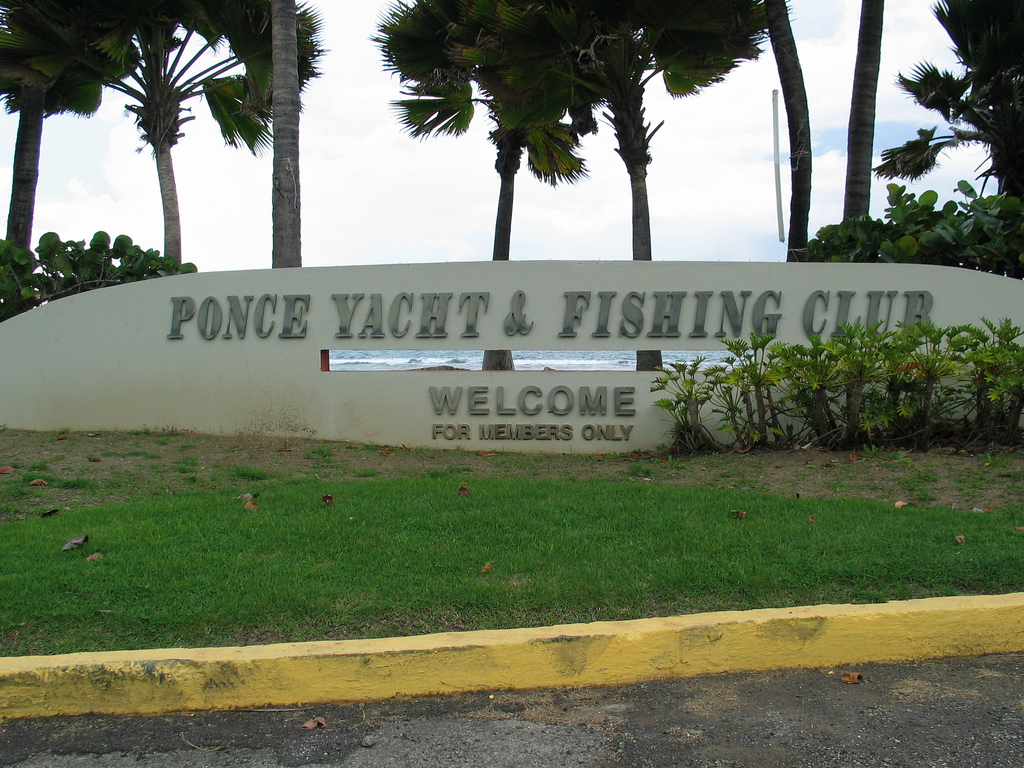
Main entrance to Club Nautico de Ponce

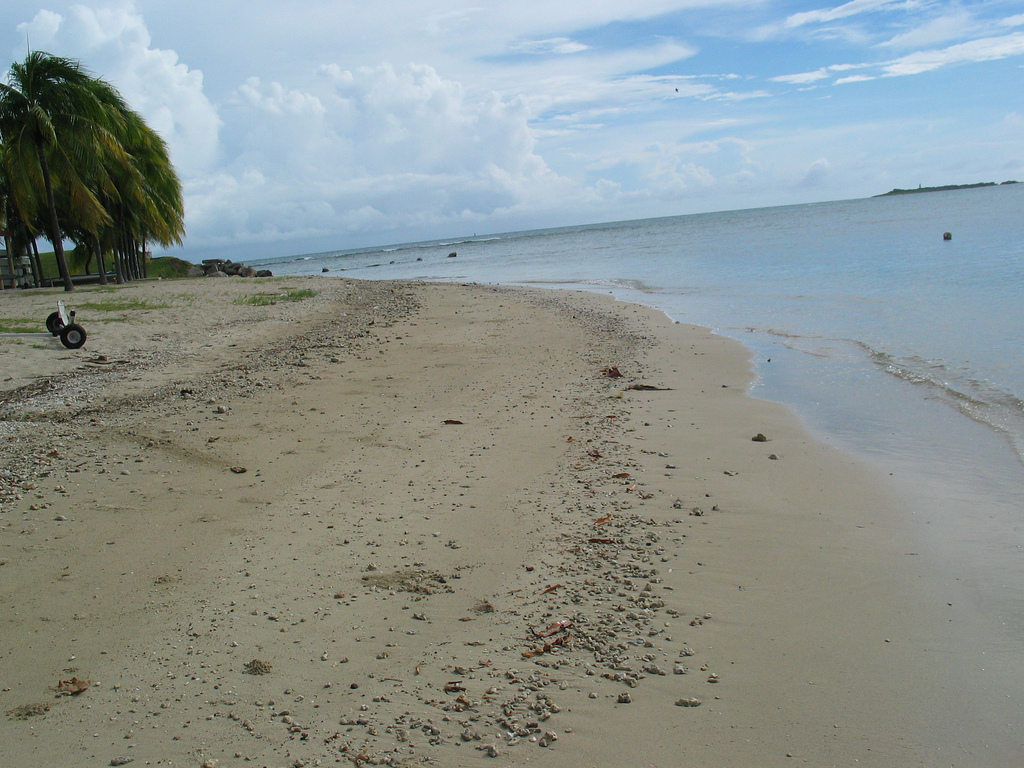
Beach at Club Nautico de Ponce

== See also ==
- Isla de Gatas
- Club Deportivo del Oeste
- Puerto Del Rey Marina
