= Vayas, Ponce =

Barrio of Ponce, Puerto Rico

Vayas
- Barrio
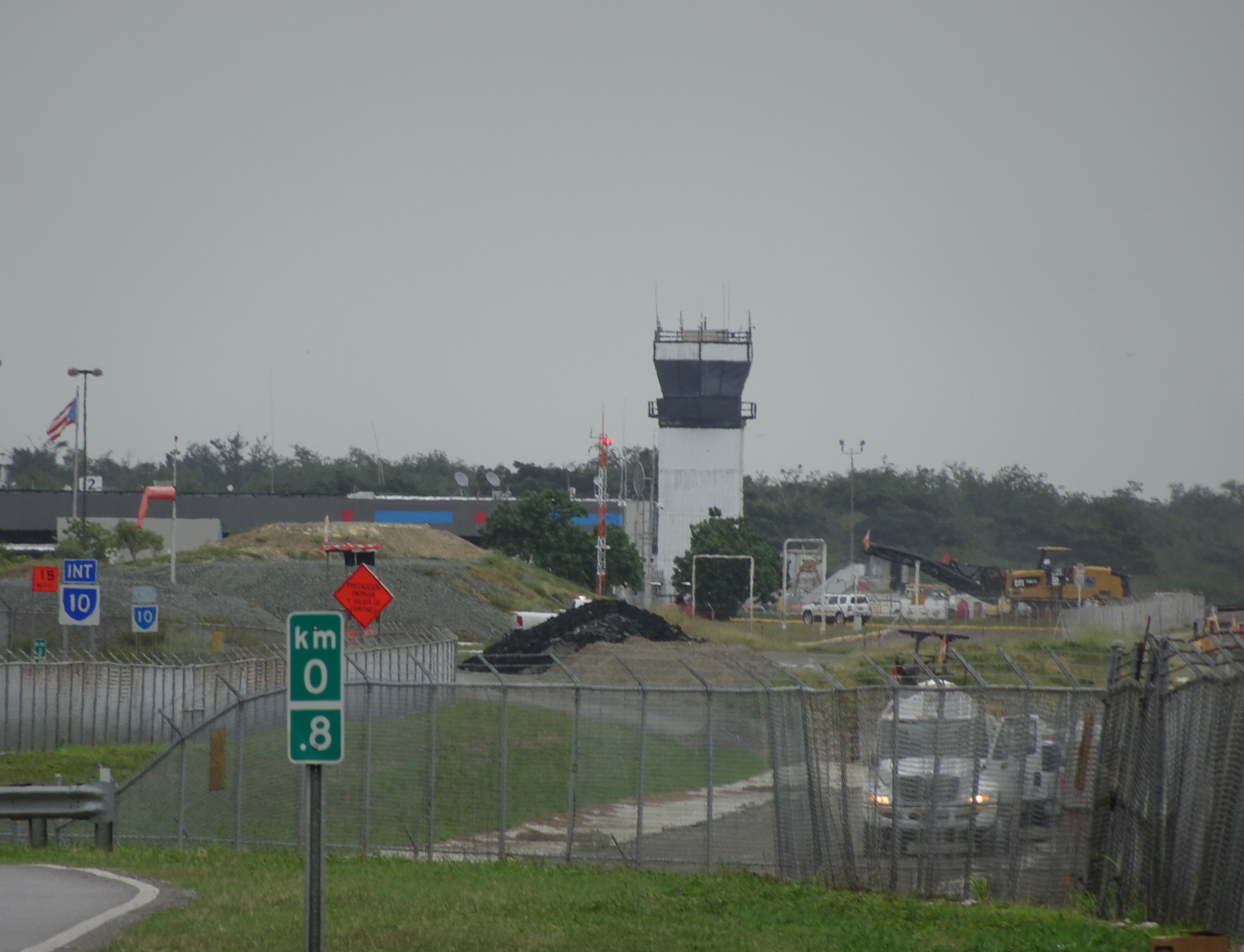
- Tower at Mercedita Airport in Vayas

- Location of Vayas barrio within the municipality of Ponce shown in red

- Location of Puerto Rico
- Coordinates: 17°58′59″N 66°34′15″W
- Commonwealth: Puerto Rico
- Municipality: Ponce

Area
  - Total: 10.44 sq mi (27.0 km^{2})
  - Land: 7.09 sq mi (18.4 km^{2})
  - Water: 3.35 sq mi (8.7 km^{2})
- Elevation: 0 ft (0 m)

Population (2010)
  - Total: 901
  - Density: 127.1/sq mi (49.1/km^{2})
- Source: 2010 Census
- Time zone: UTC−4 (AST)

Vayas is one of the 31 barrios of the municipality of Ponce, Puerto Rico. Along with Playa, Bucana, Canas and Capitanejo, Vayas is also one of Ponce's five coastal barrios. Together with Capitanejo, Vayas is also one of two rural coastal barrios in the municipality. It was organized in 1831, at which time it was divided into Vayas Norte and Vayas Sur; in 1878 the two were subsequently merged into today's Vayas.

== History ==
Barrio Vayas is one of the oldest barrios in Ponce, dating from the 1780s. Its name can be seen spelled as "Bayas", "Vallas, and even "Ballas", but the official name is nowadays spelled "Vayas". It is believed that name came from the stakes used by farmers to mark the extension of their lands, in the times when those lands were used for pasturing herds.

== Location ==
Vayas is a rural, coastal barrio located in the southern region of the municipality, east of downtown Ponce, and southeast of the traditional center of the city, Plaza Las Delicias. It is located at 18.0107°N 66.5567°W, with an elevation of 43 feet. The toponymy, or origin of the name, is related to the edges or boundary (a type of fencing) to cordon off a land area or barrio.

== Boundaries ==
It is bounded on the North by PR-1 and La Esperanza Street, on the South by the Caribbean Sea, on the West by Bucara Street/Los Caobos Avenue, PR-52 (roughly), and the Costa Caribe Country Club East Access Road, and on the East by Río Inabón.

In terms of barrio-to-barrio boundaries, Vayas is bounded in the North by Sabanetas and Coto Laurel, in the South by the Caribbean Sea, in the West by Bucaná, and in the East by Capitanejo.

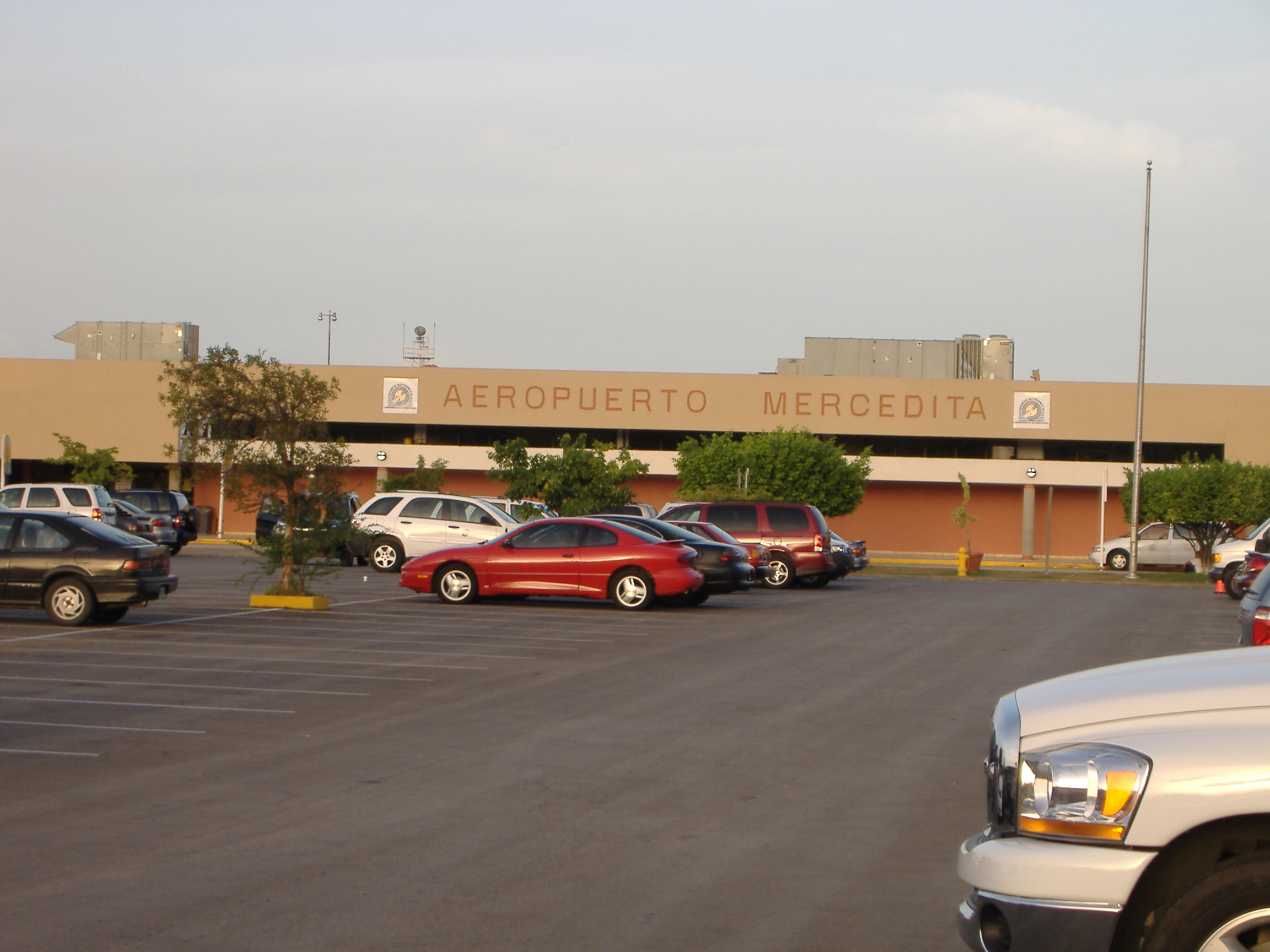
Mercedita Airport in Barrio Vayas

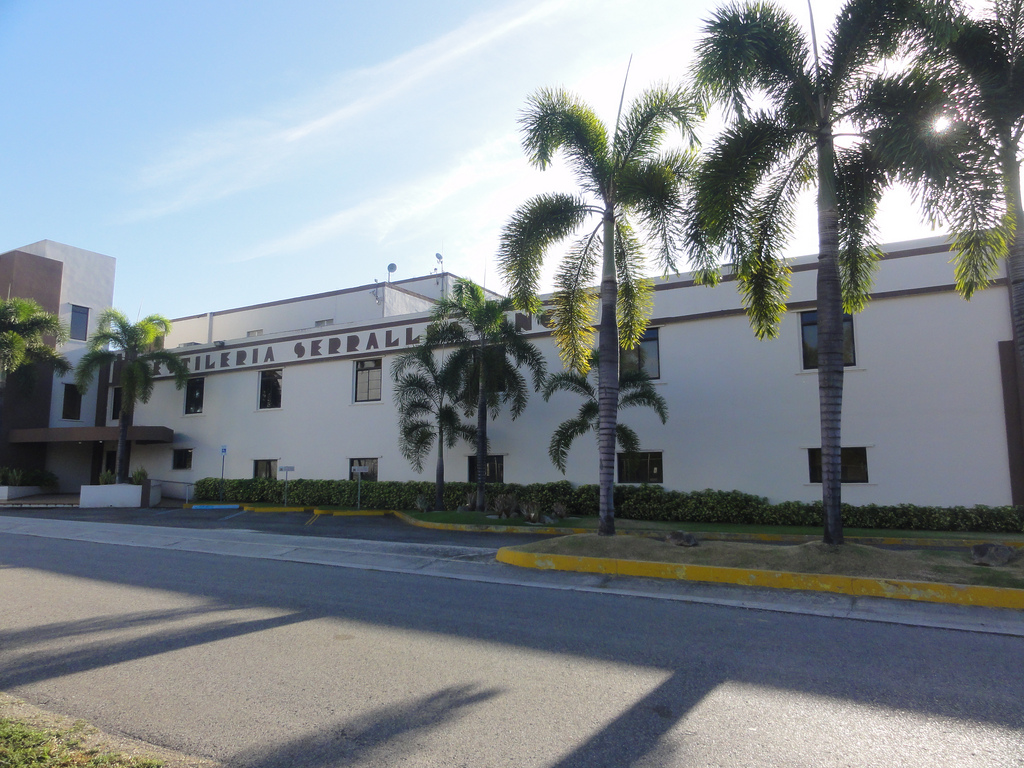
Destileria Serralles

== Features and demographics ==
Unlike most other barrios of Ponce, Vayas' landscape is entirely flat. Vayas has the third longest coastline of all five of Ponce's coastal barrios, after Canas and Playa. Vayas has 7.1 square miles (18 km^{2}) of land area and 3.4 square miles (8.8 km^{2}) of water area.

In 2000, the population of Vayas was 1,338 persons, and it had a density of 188 persons per square mile.

In 2010, the population of Vayas was 901 persons, and it had a density of 127.1 persons per square mile.

The main roads serving barrio Vayas are PR-52 and PR-1.

Historical population
Census	Pop.	Note	%±
1910	720		—
1920	633		−12.1%
1930	790		24.8%
1940	621		−21.4%
1950	1,530		146.4%
1960	1,641		7.3%
1970	1,375		−16.2%
1980	1,160		−15.6%
1990	1,153		−0.6%
2000	1,338		16.0%
2010	901		−32.7%
U.S. Decennial Census; 1899 (shown as 1900) 1910-1930; 1930-1950 1960 1980-2000 2010

== Notable landmarks ==
Vayas barrio is home to Ponce's Mercedita Airport and Destileria Serralles.

The community of Vayas Torres is among the communities located in Barrio Vayas.

== Notable people from Vayas ==
- Carmín Vega, comedian from the Mercedita sector of Barrio Vayas.

== See also ==
- List of communities in Puerto Rico
