= Gatas (Ponce) =

Small island of Ponce, Puerto Rico

Isla de Gatas
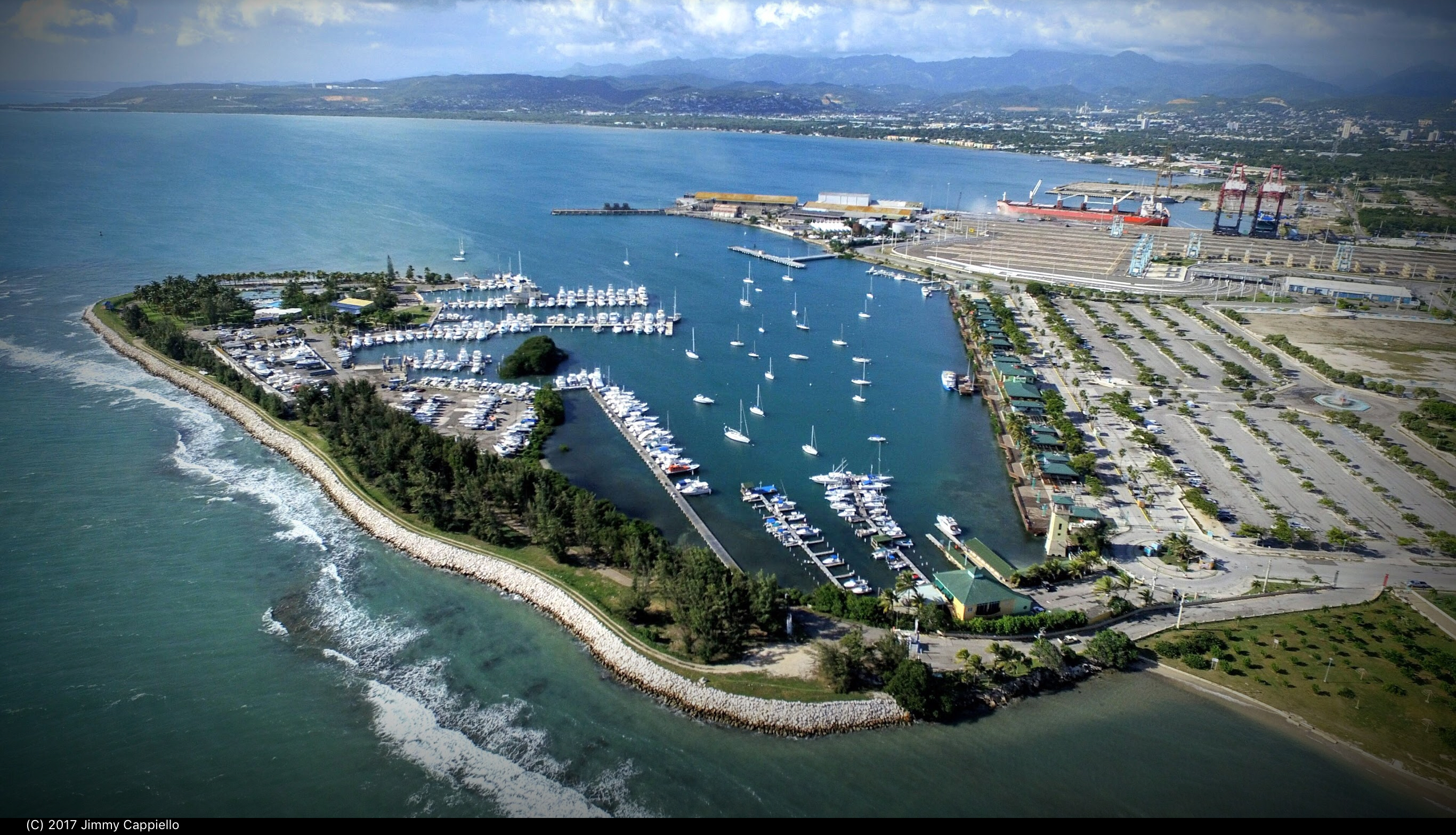
- Isla de Gatas on the left and its connection to the mainland

- Location within Puerto Rico

Geography
- Location: Ponce, Puerto Rico
- Coordinates: 17°57′49″N 66°37′05″W
- Area: 0.053 km^{2} (0.020 sq mi)

Administration
- Puerto Rico
- Commonwealth: Puerto Rico
- Municipality: Ponce
- Barrio: Playa

Demographics
- Population: 0
- Pop. density: 0/km^{2} (0/sq mi)

Gatas, or more commonly Isla de Gatas, is a small island in barrio Playa in the municipality of Ponce in southern Puerto Rico. A tied island since the 1950s connected to the Puerto Rico mainland via a tombolo, Isla de Gatas is home to Club Náutico de Ponce, a private sports complex. It is located south of La Guancha and the Port of Ponce. Together with Caja de Muertos, Morrillito, Ratones, Cardona, Isla del Frio, and Isla de Jueyes, Gatas is one of seven islands in the municipality of Ponce.

== Location and geography ==
While geographically it is considered an island on its own right, Gatas is actually physically attached to the Puerto Rico mainland, thanks to the construction of a dike in the 1950s. In this sense, it is now a cape more than an island in the strictest sense. The dike grew the original one-acre island to the current 13 acres (5.261 hectares).

Gatas is located at latitude 17°57'49"N and longitude -66°37'05" (Latitude. 17.96944°, Longitude. -66.6175°) The island, located 0.12 mi (0.2 km) south of the mainland Puerto Rican shore across from Punta Peñoncillo, extends 0.31 mi (0.5 km) west from Punta Caranero to the east.

The island has an elevation of 10 feet, and it has a beach on the western side.

== Development ==
The island is a small low island and fully developed thanks to the construction of the Club Nautico de Ponce and its marina.

== See also ==
- List of islands of Puerto Rico
