= Cardona Island Light =

Lighthouse on Cardona Island, Puerto Rico

Cardona Island Lighthouse
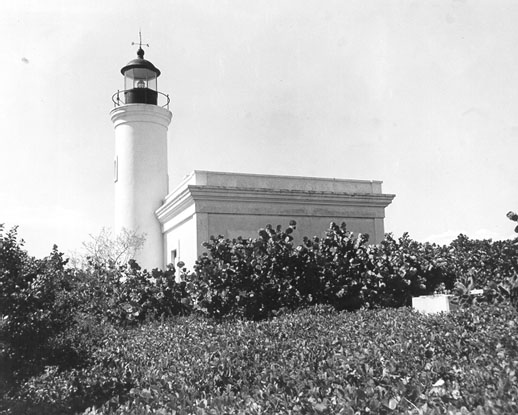
- Location: Ponce, Puerto Rico
- Coordinates: 17°57′24.48″N 66°38′6″W

Tower
- Constructed: 1889
- Foundation: stone base
- Construction: stone and brick tower
- Automated: 1962
- Height: 11 m (36 ft)
- Shape: cylindrical tower with balcony and lantern atop the keeper's house
- Markings: white tower, black lantern
- Heritage: National Register of Historic Places listed place

Light
- First lit: 1889
- Focal height: 14 m (46 ft)
- Lens: Sixth order (1889)
- Range: 8 nmi (15 km; 9.2 mi)
- Characteristic: Fl W 4s
- Faro del Puerto de Ponce
- U.S. National Register of Historic Places
- Puerto Rico Historic Sites and Zones
- Architectural style: Neoclassic
- MPS: Lighthouse System of Puerto Rico TR
- NRHP reference No.: 81000691
- Added to NRHP: October 22, 1981

Cardona Island Light (also known as Faro del Puerto de Ponce or Cayo Cardona Light) is the only 6th order lighthouse in Puerto Rico with a cylindrical attached tower. The light is located on Cardona Island, a small island on the west side of the entrance to the harbor of Ponce, Puerto Rico. It was listed in the U.S. National Register of Historic Places on 22 October 1981 and on the Puerto Rico Register of Historic Sites and Zones in 2001.

== Location ==
The light is located on a small 6-acre (2.4 ha) key, west of Ponce Harbor. Cayo Cardona Light is the western minor light that together with Guánica Light connects Los Morrillos Light and Caja de Muertos Light and guides the entrance to the Port of Ponce. The island is accessible only by private boat, but it can be seen from the observation tower on the La Guancha boardwalk. It is not open to the public.

It was first lit in 1889 and automated in 1962. In 1942, during World War II, its use was discontinued, but was relighted again on 10 November 1943. The light is still an active aid to navigation.

== Significance ==
Together with Guánica Light, Cardona Light is the western minor light which connects Cabo Rojo Light and Caja de Muertos Light and guides the entrance to a port that, during the course of last century, exported millions of pounds of sugar particularly to the United States. Architecturally, it is significant that it is the only 6th order lighthouse with a cylindrical attached tower. Also, the original brick roof and firewood beams are practically intact.

== Description ==
The lighthouse was built of stone and brick and intended for one second class keeper. The light, built in 1889, guides the entrance to the Port of Ponce, as a 6th order red fixed light.

Structurally, it followed the same construction as three other minor lights on the south and southeast shores: Punta Figuras, Punta Mulas, and Puerto Ferro. It lacks, though, the distinctive decorative elements of non-existing Punta Higuero or ruinous Guernica. Nevertheless, it possesses a charm of its own: a petite neo-classic symmetrically-balanced official design.

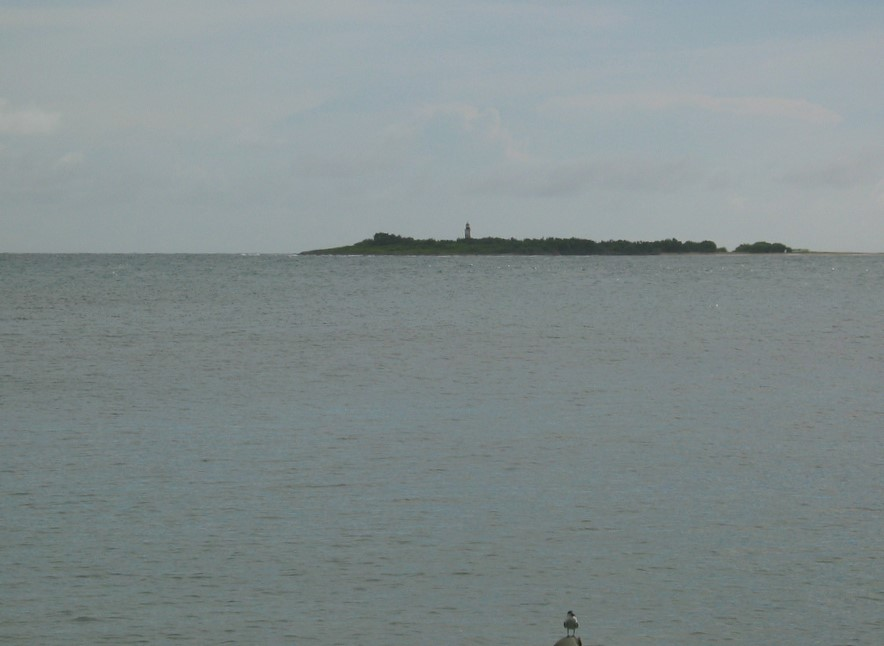
Cardona Island Light at Port of Ponce, PR, as seen from the Club Náutico de Ponce, Isla de Gatas, Ponce, Puerto Rico.

Cayo Cardona's dwelling was designed of stone and brick for one 2nd class keeper. A 33-foot (10 m) circular tower was attached to its south facade. The structure measures some 48' x 30' x 16'. Its main entrance is on the north facade which opened into a room arrangement similar to the other minor structures of the light house and described further below. The fact that no plans of this structure have been found, and that its interior has been closed off with cement makes it difficult to describe. Only secondary references, a late 19th-century photo of the site, and official references to the similar or identical design of the minor lights allows a reserved description of this particular site.

The c. 1898 photo available depicts a simple neo-classic building with a rather elaborate cornice and a simple roof parapet. Contrary to other minor lights, the tower is cylindrical, crowned by another cornice less elaborated than the dwelling's. The photograph states that the structure was painted white and light blue.

The tower's cast-iron stairway led to an octagonal glass, copper, and cast-iron lantern with vertical bars and a cast-iron balustrade surrounding an exterior cement gallery.

The original illuminating apparatus, still in use, is an 1888, 6th order fixed red lenticular lens manufactured by Sautter, Lemonnier & Company of France. It is 12 inches (30 cm) in diameter. The lens has four panels, with five elements in each panel of the central drum, and five prisms on each panel above the central drum and two below. It was held in place by a cast-iron pedestal. The original light was colored by a red chimney. The original light characteristics were modified in 1922 and 1938. In 1962 it was electrified and, apparently, unmanned.

== See also ==
- List of lighthouses in Puerto Rico
- Isla Cardona
