= Cardona (surname) =

Cardona is a Catalan surname originating from the town of Cardona, in Catalonia. Notable people with the surname include:

- Andrea Cardona (born 1982), Guatemalan mountain climber
- Benjamín Cardona (born 1957), Colombian footballer
- Carlos Cardona (born 1974), Colombian businessman
- Daniel Cardona (1890–1943), Spanish politician
- Edwin Cardona (born 1992), Colombian footballer
- Fernanda Cardona (born 1977), Uruguayan politician
- George Cardona, American linguist and Indologist
- Germán Cardona Gutiérrez (born 1956), Colombian politician
- Jaime Cardona (died 1466), Spanish cardinal
- Javier Cardona (born 1975), American baseball player
- José Cardona (1939–2013), Honduran footballer
- José Miró Cardona (1902–1974), Cuban politician
- Juan Carlos Cardona (born 1974), Colombian long-distance runner
- Julian Cardona (born 1990), Puerto Rican footballer
- Julián Cardona, Colombian cyclist
- Hélène Cardona, Poet, linguist, literary translator and actor
- Leonardo Cardona (born 1971), Colombian cyclist
- Manuel Cardona (1974–2014), Spanish physicist
- Manolo Cardona (born 1977), Colombian actor
- Marcel Cardona, Belizean politician
- Maria Cardona (born 1966), American political strategist and commentator
- Maria de Cardona (1509–1563), Italian noblewoman
- María de los Angeles Cardona (1940–1991), Spanish biologist
- Mark Cardona (born 1981), Filipino basketball player
- Matt Cardona (born 1985), American professional wrestler
- Marta Cardona (born 1995), Spanish footballer
- Miguel Cardona, American educator and 12th Secretary of Education
- Milton Cardona, Puerto Rican musician
- Paul Cardona (1953–2023), Gozitan priest
- Pepe Cardona (died 2020), American pop-rock singer, member of the band Alive 'N Kickin'
- Prudencio Cardona (1951–2019), Colombian boxer
- René Cardona Jr. (1939–2003), Mexican film director and actor
- Ricardo Cardona (chef), American chef
- Ricardo Cardona (boxer) (1952–2015), Colombian boxer
- Robert D. Cardona (born 1930), American writer
- Salvador Cardona (1901–1985), Spanish cyclist
- Santos Cardona (1974–2009), United States Army soldier
- Trinidad Cardona (born 1999), American singer and songwriter
- Virginia Cardona (born 1967), Spanish volleyball player
