= Cardona =

Cardona may refer to:

- Cardona (surname), a surname (and list of people with the surname)
- Duke of Cardona, a Spanish title
- Segundo Cardona, Puerto Rican architect and developer
- Cardona, Rizal, a municipality in the Philippines
- Cardona, Spain, a municipality in Catalonia, Spain
- Cardona, Uruguay. a municipality in Uruguay
- Cardona (Ponce), an island in Puerto Rico
  - Cardona Island Light, a lighthouse on Cardona Island

== See also ==
- Cadorna (disambiguation)
- Cardrona (disambiguation)
