= Guánica Light =

Lighthouse at Guánica, Puerto Rico

Guánica Lighthouse
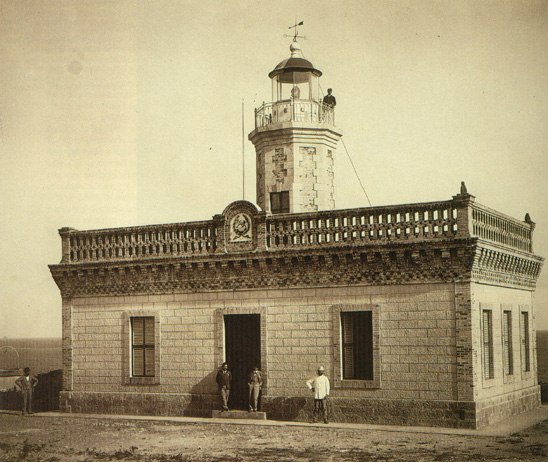
- The lighthouse ca. 1898
- Location: Guánica, Puerto Rico
- Coordinates: 17°57′3″N 66°54′11″W

Tower
- Construction: brick and cement blocks tower
- Shape: octagonal tower with balcony and lantern
- Heritage: National Register of Historic Places listed place

Light
- First lit: 1893
- Deactivated: 1950
- Lens: Sixth-order Fresnel
- Faro de Guanica (Note: The light's name is presented here without the accent on "Guánica" in conformance with the usage in the light's National Register nomination form and Federal Register announcement of listing.)
- U.S. National Register of Historic Places
- Puerto Rico Historic Sites and Zones
- MPS: Lighthouse System of Puerto Rico TR
- NRHP reference No.: 77001549

Guánica Light (Spanish: Faro de Guánica) was a historic lighthouse located in the municipality of Guánica, Puerto Rico, in the Guánica State Forest. It was first lit in 1893 and deactivated in 1950. The light marked the entrance to Guánica Bay and bridged the gap between Los Morrillos Light and Caja de Muertos Light.

On July 25, 1898, lighthouse keeper Robustiano Rivera spotted the convoy of the American forces that initiated the landing offensive of the Puerto Rican Campaign during the Spanish–American War. He immediately gave the alert to the residents of Guánica and marched to Yauco where he broke the news of the invading forces to the city's mayor.

By 2009, the lighthouse was practically in ruins, though some parts of its unique architectural elements were still visible. It was listed in the U.S. National Register of Historic Places in 1981, and on the Puerto Rico Register of Historic Sites and Zones in 2000.

A series of earthquakes that occurred in January 2020 in Puerto Rico further damaged the Guánica lighthouse.

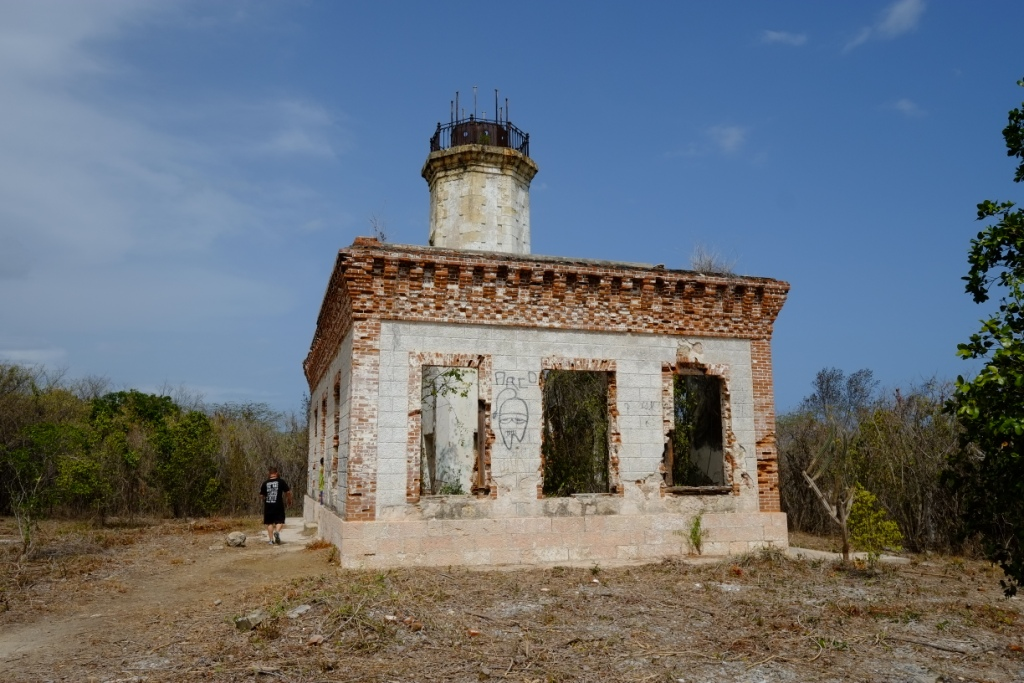
Guanica Lighthouse in 2014

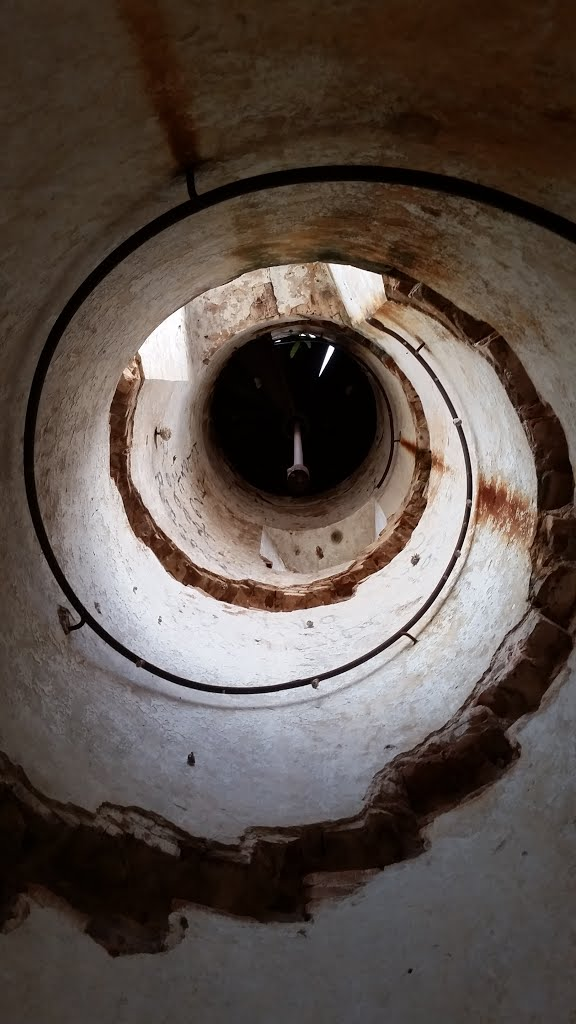
2015

== See also ==
- List of lighthouses in Puerto Rico
