= Isla Cabras Light =

Lighthouse near Ceiba, Puerto Rico

Isla Cabras Lighthouse
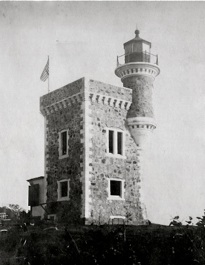
- View of the lighthouse in 1916
- Location: Ceiba, Puerto Rico
- Coordinates: 18°12′42″N 65°36′0″W

Tower
- Construction: Stone
- Automated: 1931
- Shape: Cylindrical attached to a square house
- Markings: Natural "Turret"

Light
- First lit: 1908
- Deactivated: 1946
- Lens: Sixth-order Fresnel 1908

Isla Cabras Light, also known as Faro de Isla Cabras, was a lighthouse located on a rocky but flat islet with the same name, which sit just off the coast near Ceiba, Puerto Rico, toward the Vieques Passage.

== Planning and construction ==
Fishing boats were not the only ones to cross the Vieques Passage, but also ocean-going ships. In fact, the expanse of water between Isla Cabras and Vieques had become an important passway during the long duration of the Spanish colonial rule in Puerto Rico. So, when in 1869 Madrid approved the lighthouse's construction on Isla Cabras, few questioned its wisdom. The initiative was not an isolated event, but part of an island-wide modernization project for "maritime illumination" (es: "Plan de Alumbrado Maritimo en la Isla de Puerto Rico"). Puerto Rico's coasts were coming into the light with the establishment of fourteen lighthouses of which the Isla Cabras Light was the twelfth in line.

At its roots, the project responded to unprecedented political pressure. Accusations against the Crown of abandonment and military upheavals of which the Grito de Lares ("Lares Cry" or "Lares Uprising") was only the best known, marked the year 1868. The following decade saw in Puerto Rico the formation of political parties, the abolition of slavery and environmental legislations like the act to protect the Yunque, among the oldest U.S. National Parks. Though the increasingly liberal local government showed signs of life and interest in developing the island's infrastructure, the overstretched Spanish Empire, embroiled in wars for independence in Cuba and the Philippines, neglected the construction of the Isla Cabras Light.

In 1898, during the Spanish–American War, the U.S. fleet maneuvered near the Isla Cabras, learning first hand the value of its position between the bays of Bahía de Puerca and Ensenada Honda. Soon after replacing the Puerto Rican autonomous government with a military regime, the U.S. picked up the light project as part of its naval expansion in the Caribbean area. In 1904, the U.S. Coast Guard purchased the 20 acres (8 ha) of land for $200, and by May 13, 1908, the lighthouse was ready for service. The cost of the undertaking, including the entrance road and the pier, reached a total of $5654.55.

== Structure ==
The lighthouse building was unique among the lighthouses in Puerto Rico in that it resembled the rectangular shape and design of the better-known light in the Morro, but with the castle's stone structure. Differently from its San Juan relative, the building overseeing the Vieques Passage was a small two-story lightgray stone daymark structure with a red stripe and a clear white trim. Its black lantern room sat on a small cylindrical tower on of its corners at the top of the building. It stood 78 feet off the ground, and projected a white light visible all around, showing higher intensity on range line for nine miles away (some even say 14). Its original lens was a sixth-order Fresnel lens.

== Employment ==
A keeper managed the light and occupied the building's two rooms. As the islands of Culebra and Vieques became both military posts and tourists destinations, the lighthouse played a role in safeguarding the increasing number of trips across the passage. Traveler's accounts refer to its beauty and powerful light over the waters. In 1937, as part of the changes that Gustaf Dalén affected in the gas and lighthouse technologies, the authorities installed an automated acetylene torch. Six years later, the building was closed and boarded. In 1965 the light was replaced with a range light called "Vieques Southwest Channel Range Front Light". The original structure was destroyed in 1966.

== Setting ==
Isla Cabras is located in the former Roosevelt Roads Naval Station. The small island separates the entrance of Puerca Bay, a small open-mouth bay and the Ensenada Honda harbor. The island is connected to the mainland by a causeway.

== Gallery ==
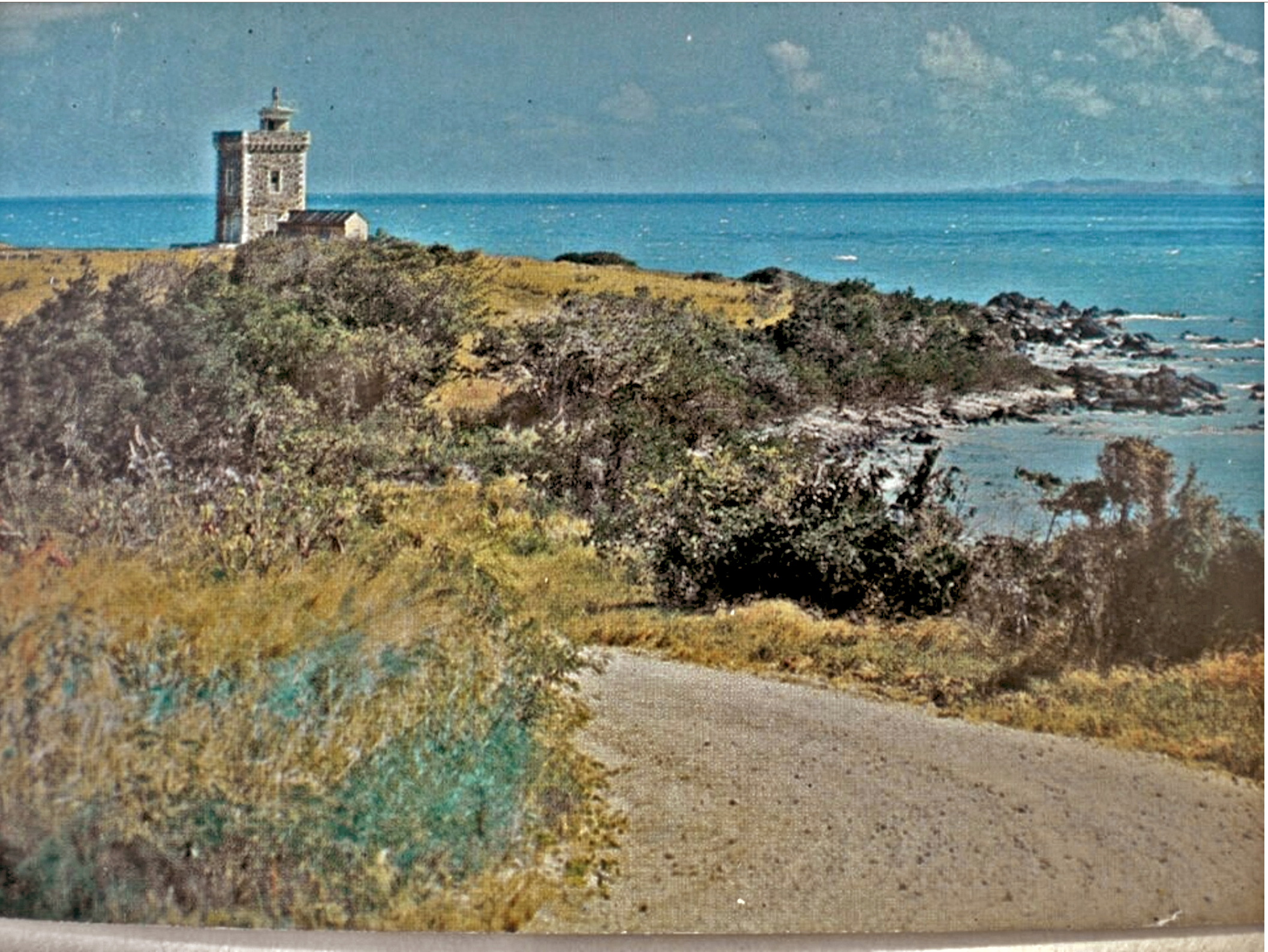
Faro Isla Cabras, Puerto Rico (Encenada Honda, Ceiba)

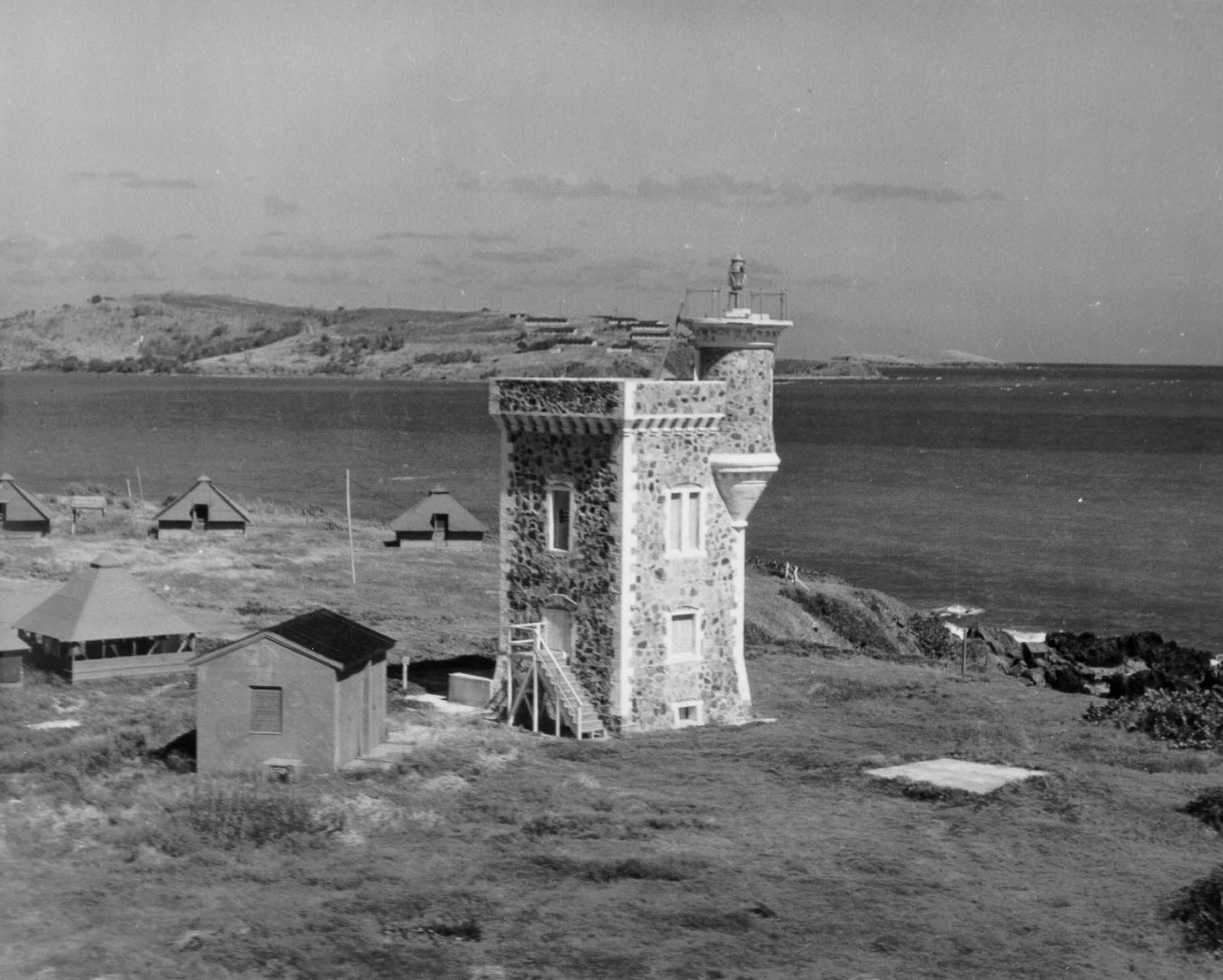
Missing the black lantern room, January 16, 1946

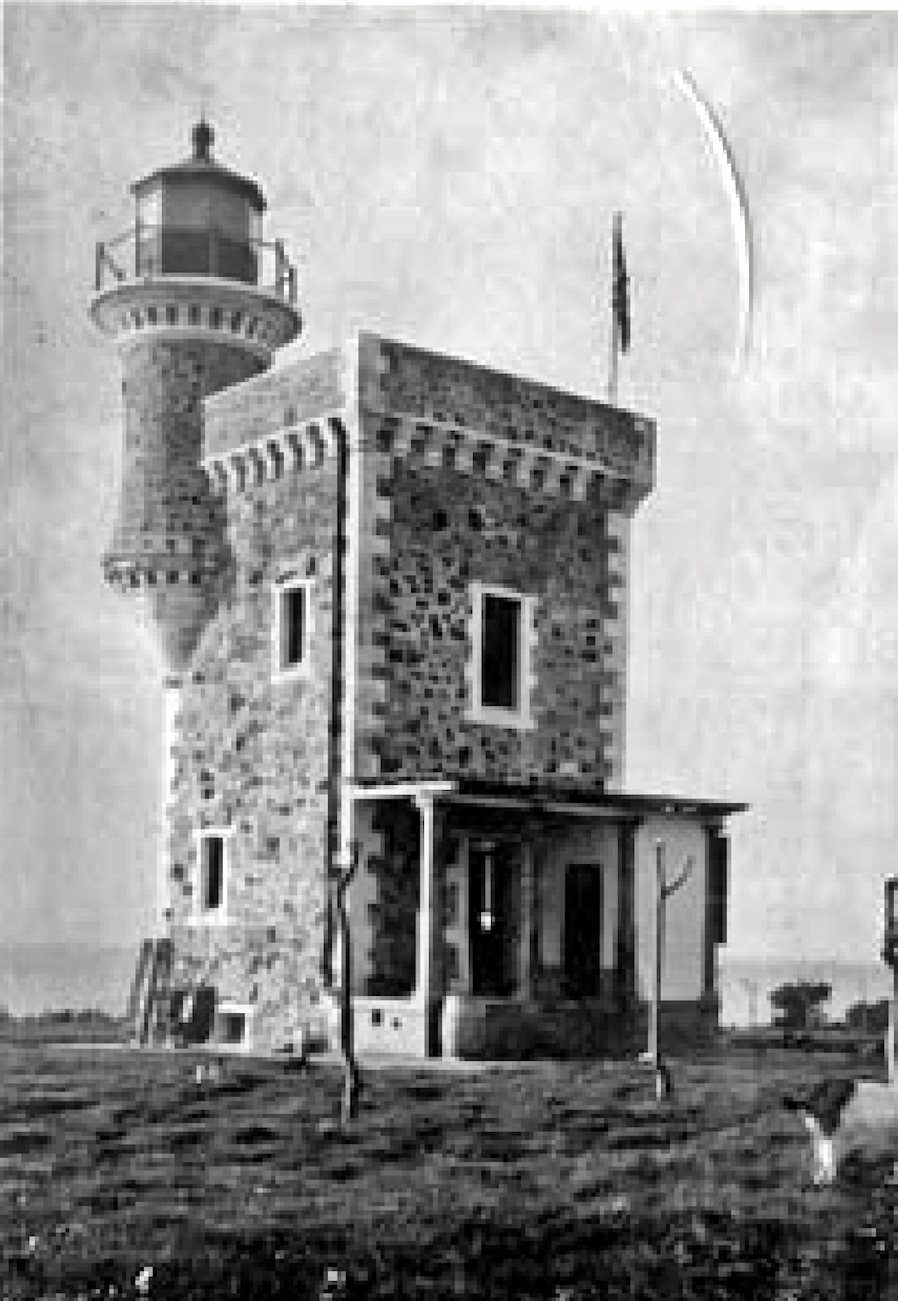
Faro Isla Cabras, 1916

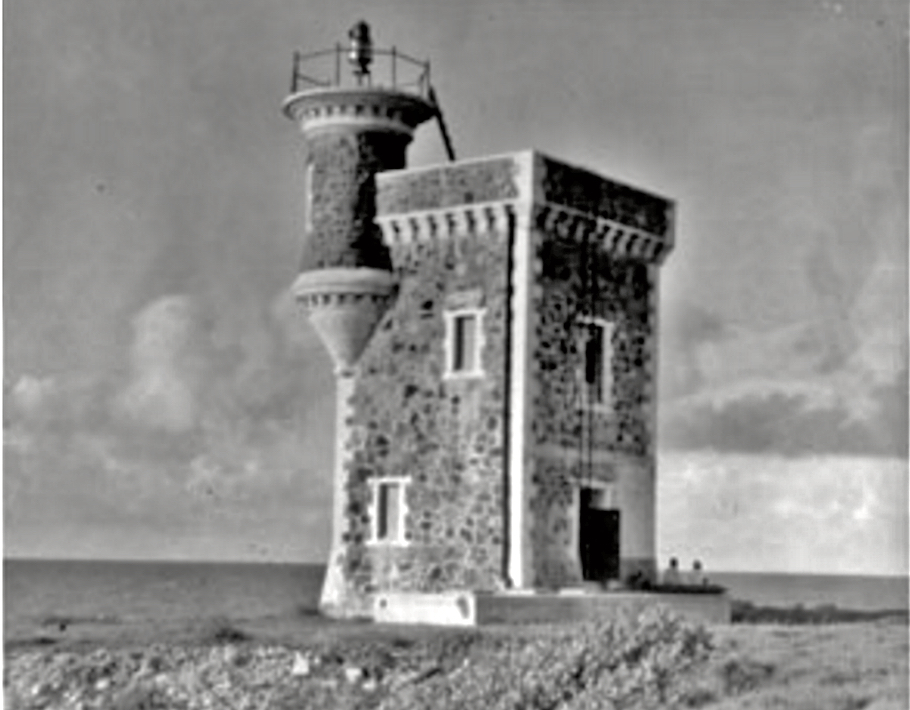
Faro Isla Cabras 1937

Ensenada Honda, Soundings in Feet

== See also ==
- List of lighthouses in Puerto Rico
