= Cadorna =

Cadorna may refer to

- Cadorna (surname), Italian surname
- Cadorna (Milan Metro), a subway station
- Milano Cadorna railway station, a railway station
- Piazzale Cadorna, a Milan, Italy, square
- Cadorna, a subclass of the Italian Navy Condottieri class cruiser
- Cadorna Line, Italian defensive system on the northern border facing Switzerland
- Cadorna's pipistrelle, species of vesper bat in the family Vespertilionidae

== See also ==
- General Cadorna
- Cardona (disambiguation)
- Cardrona (disambiguation)
