= Cardano =

Cardano may refer to:

- Gerolamo Cardano (1501–1576), Italian mathematician and physician
- Fazio Cardano (1444–1524), Italian jurist and mathematician, father of Gerolamo
- Cardano al Campo, town in Lombardy
- 11421 Cardano, minor planet
- Cardano (blockchain platform)

== See also ==
- Cardano's method of solving a cubic equation
- Baguenaudier, aka Cardano's rings, mechanical puzzle
- Cardanus (crater), lunar crater
- Cardona (disambiguation)
