= Florit =

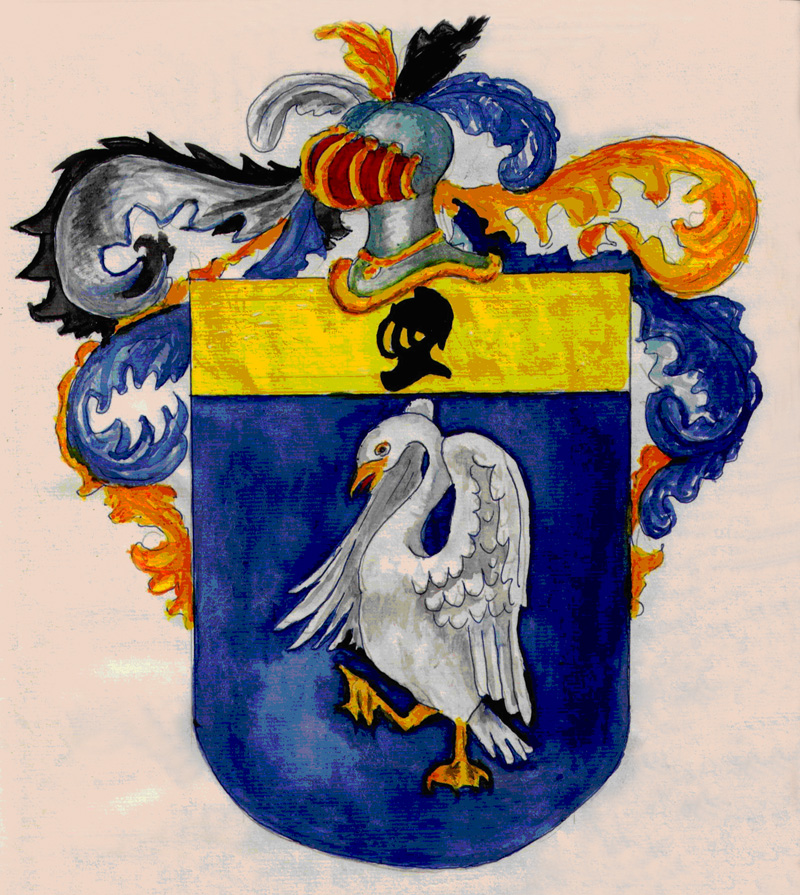
Coat of arms Florit.

Florit is a surname that originates in Languedoc (France). In the early 15th century, some of the cavaliers from Languedoc moved to Aragon and settled in Catalonia and the Balearic Islands.

== Coat of arms ==
Spanish: "Trae de azur y cisne de plata, linguado de gules, picado y membrado de oro. Jefe de oro, y yelmo de sable. Timbre de caballero: yelmo de acero terciado, adornado con rejillas y bordura de oro y forrado de gules. En su cirnera, penacho de plumas. Pendientes de la parte superior del yelmo y rodeado éste y la mitad alta del escudo, lambrequines que, como las plumas, son de los colores y metales del blasón, es decir: oro y plata, azur y sable."

The coat of arms is not the property of a whole surname, but only belongs to a specific family ennobled by the monarch. No one else, not even collateral relatives, are legally allowed to use it. However, non-ennobled people (from Menorca) can use it privately if it is modified to omit certain details reserved for the noble family, i.e., the shape of the heraldic shield, the helmet and its accessories. Also, the silver swan on the blue field can be moved inside a seal, a circle, an oval, a rectangle, a square, etc.

== Notable people ==
- Ermenegildo Florit (1901–1985), Italian Cardinal of the Roman Catholic Church
- Eugenio Florit (1903–1999), Cuban writer, essayist, literary critic, translator, radio actor and diplomat
- Francesc Alomar Florit (1928–1955), Spanish racing cyclist
- Jimena Florit, female cyclist from Argentina, specializing in competitive mountain biking
- Urbain de Florit de La Tour de Clamouze, French nobleman
- Maria Àngels Cardona i Florit (1940–1991), biologist, ecologist and botanist from Menorca, who worked mainly in Barcelona
- Jaime Alomar Florit (born 1937), Spanish road racing cyclist
- Luis Hector Florit Molina (born 1944), from Argentina, CEO of ABC Tax Service, Florida.
