= Orange Walk East =

Electoral constituency in Belize

- Constituency for the Belize House of Representatives
- District: Orange Walk

Current constituency

Orange Walk East is an electoral constituency in the Orange Walk District represented in the House of Representatives of the National Assembly of Belize.

== Area representatives ==
Election	Area representative	Party
1984	Elodio Aragon Sr.	UDP
1989	Elodio Aragon Sr.	UDP
1993	Elodio Aragon Sr.	UDP
1998	Dave Burgos	PUP
2003	Dave Burgos	PUP
2008	Marcel Cardona	UDP
2012	Marco Tulio Mendez	PUP
2015	Elodio Aragon Jr.	UDP
2020	Kevin Bernard	PUP
2025	Kevin Bernard	PUP

== Elections ==
Election	Political result	Candidate	Party	Votes	%	±%
2025 general election Electorate: 7,633; Turnout: 4,754 (62.28%) −23.57	PUP hold Majority: 1,859 (31.48%) +10.45	Kevin Bernard	PUP	3,993	83.99	+29.03
2025 general election Electorate: 7,633; Turnout: 4,754 (62.28%) −23.57	PUP hold Majority: 1,859 (31.48%) +10.45	Marlo Alexis Perera	UDP	466	9.80	−34.62
2025 general election Electorate: 7,633; Turnout: 4,754 (62.28%) −23.57	PUP hold Majority: 1,859 (31.48%) +10.45	Lance Bentley Pelayo	UDP	161	3.39	−40.41
