= Ricardo Cardona =

Ricardo Cardona may refer to:

- Ricardo Cardona (chef), chef in New York City
- Ricardo Cardona (boxer) (1952–2015), Colombian boxer
