= Cadorna (surname) =

Cadorna is an Italian surname. Notable people with the surname include:

- Carlo Cadorna (1809–1891), Italian politician
- Raffaele Cadorna (1815–1897), general of the Risorgimento, brother of Carlo
- Raffaele Cadorna Jr. (1889–1973), leader of Italian partisans in World War II
- Luigi Cadorna (1850–1928), field marshal in World War I

== See also ==
- Cadorna (disambiguation)
