= Ensenada Honda (Ceiba, Puerto Rico) =

Inlet on Puerto Rico's northeastern coast

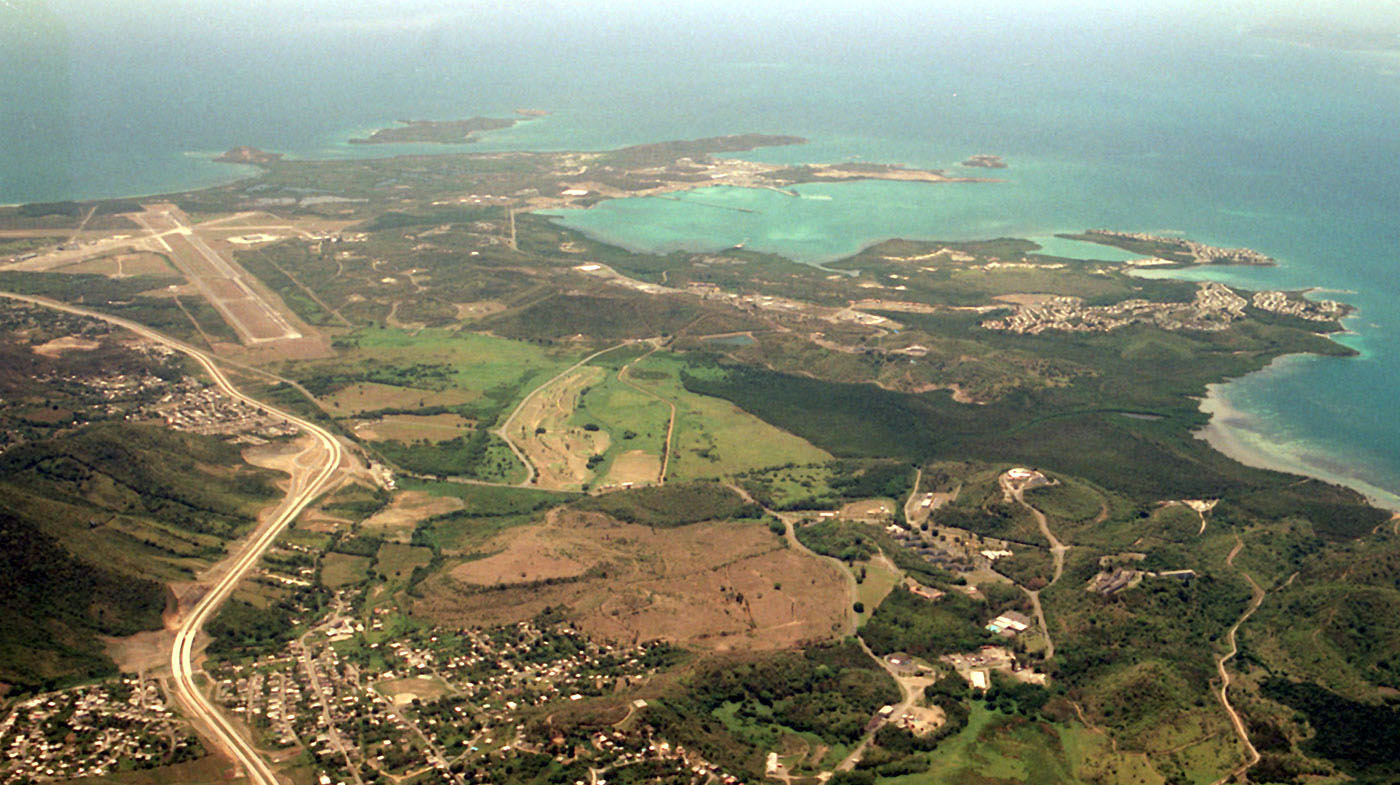
- Aerial view of Ensenada Honda

- Ensenada Honda in Ceiba, Puerto Rico
- Location: Ceiba, Puerto Rico
- Coordinates: 18°12′41″N 65°36′54″W
- Type: Bay
- Ocean/sea sources: North Atlantic Ocean
- Managing agency: Department of Natural and Environmental Resources, Puerto Rico Ports Authority
- Surface area: 1,664 acres (673 ha)
- Max. depth: 40.5 ft (12.3 m)
- Islands: Isla Cabras
- Settlements: Ceiba, Puerto Rico
- Website: www.rooseveltroads.pr.gov

Ensenada Honda (English: Deep Cove), is an inlet on Puerto Rico's northeastern coast, in the municipality of Ceiba. Early indigenous resistance and the absence of gold kept cash-strapped colonial administrations mostly away from the region, which in time grew into a pirate and smuggling hub. In the 19th century, the bay's harbor facilitated the growth of the sugarcane industry, and in the 20th century, it hosted the Roosevelt Roads U.S. Naval Station. At present, a Reserve Component maintains a military presence in the area, but the inlet, along with a civilian airport, is the focus of local tourism and the fishing industry. As part of negotiations with the U.S. Navy, Ensenada Honda is also the object of preservation projects.

== Geography ==
Ensenada Honda is about 4.6 square miles in area, but with a maximum depth of 40 1/2 foot, it is the second deepest bay in Puerto Rico after San Juan Bay. It flanks the open water passage known as "Radas Roosevelt" in the Vieques Strait and sits near the trafficked "Pasaje de Medio Mundo" (English: Middle of the World Passage).

Mercator projection of Ensenada Honda

Ensenada Honda ebbs about 2 miles northwestward, between the capes of Cabra de Tierra and Punta Cascajo. Cabra de Tierra is the southern tip of the headland that separates Bahía de Puerca and Ensenada Honda. Cabra de Tierra is 35 feet high and rocky with a few scrub trees. Buoys mark a dredged channel that leads northwestward into the harbor from a position of about 1/2/mile southward of Cabra de Tierra. A shore bank with a depth of fewer than 3 fathoms stretches for about 1 mile southeastward from Punta Cascajo.

Inside the harbor, there are depths of 5 to 7 fathoms outside of the shore bank, which as defined by the 3-fathom curve, stretches unevenly up to 3/4 mile offshore from the northwestern side of the harbor. Anchorage can be taken in 5 to 7 fathoms in the middle part of Ensenada Honda. The bottom is soft mud. Punta Cascajo is the western entrance point of Ensenada Honda, at 69 feet high with cliffs on the southern side. Punta Cascajo's highest point is cleared, while mangroves fringe the shoreline. A reef lies on the shore bank at about 250 yards on the inlet's southern side.

== Early history ==
Protected mangrove forest on the shoreline

Early written sources relate little about the eastern portion of Borikén, Puerto Rico's indigenous name. Regardless of the scant data, the prehistoric cove must have been a busy place according to rock carvings, some of which still adorn its coast. It should have become a combined Taíno and Kalinago (or Caribs) stronghold just before the moment of contact with the Atlantic sojourners who came from across the ocean on caravels in 1493.

Late in the Pre-Columbian era, a group of Kalinagos had begun a gradual migration from the Orinoco's basin, occupying the Lesser Antilles while moving north and reaching the nearby islands of Vieques and Culebra. By 1508, when Juan Ponce de León's team of Iberian adventurers had claimed the San Juan Bay on the northern coast and settled Caparra, the Caribs must have already established hegemony over the Ensenada Honda. According to colonial reports, their attacks proceeded from the Vieques Strait area, where they coordinated military movements with rebellious Taíno caciques in the east.

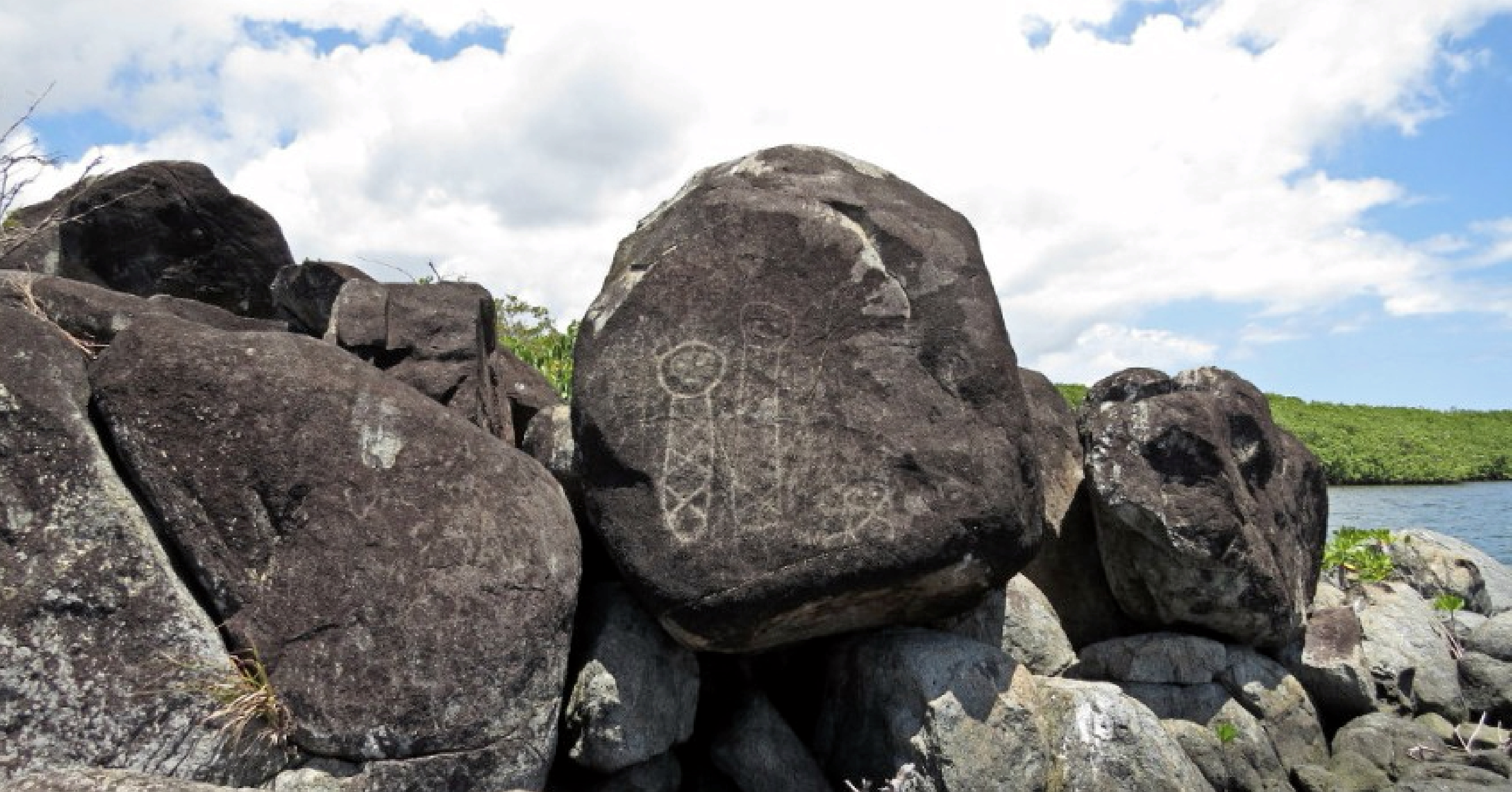
Piedra del Indio, in Ceiba, Puerto Rico (Ensenada Honda)

European invaders had entered Puerto Rico from the west in search of the island's meager mineral wealth and seeking the submission of densely populated Taíno kingdoms. The alliance between caciques on the east and the more battled-experience Kalinagos from Vieques and Culebra however, eventually slowed down the Spanish advance and made the eastern coast less appealing to the colonizers.

While Spanish colonists established a prosperous harbor on the San Juan Bay, no major port developed on Ensenada Honda for most of the colonial period, regardless of its appealing qualities. Pirates and buccaneers, however, discovered the inlet's strategic value and for centuries, the region became known for smuggling and piracy. Even the infamous Puerto Rican pirate, Roberto Cofresí, is said to have used the inlet as an entry point to mainland Puerto Rico from Vieques and Culebra. In 1819, according to a letter from Captain José de Torres, corsairs, apparently South American insurgents (patriots), determined to subvert the Spanish colonial power, landed on the Ensenada Honda but were repelled by the Fajardo local militia. The corsairs' attack led the authorities to pay more attention to the vulnerable region.

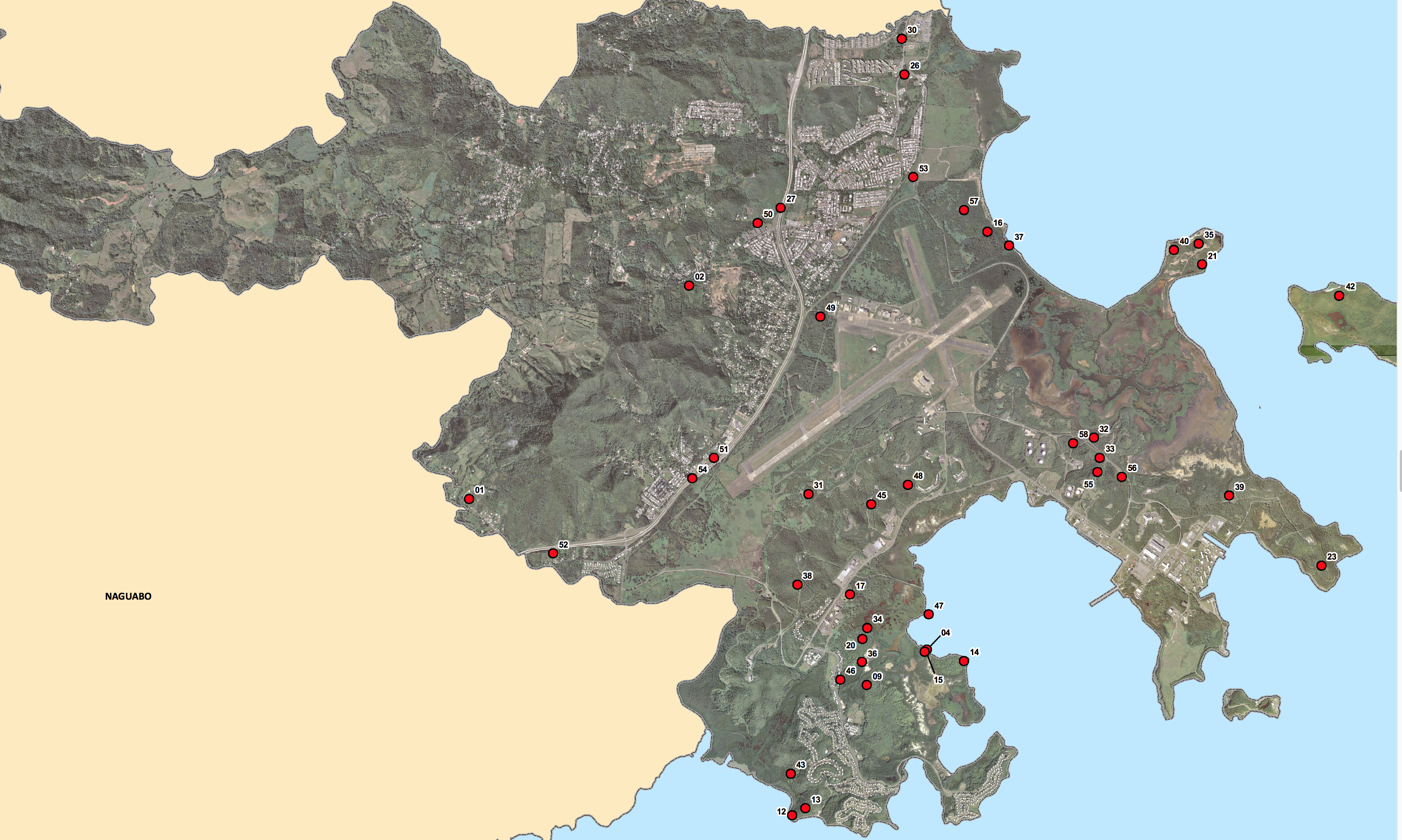
(2014) Ceiba, indigenous archeological sites

In 1813, Iñigo Abbad y Lasierra mentioned the "Ensenada Honda" in the first major publication of Puerto Rico's history, but only in passing. It took the independent-minded leaders of the "Seiba" barrio to branch off from the municipality of Fajardo and establish the town of Ceiba at the side of the bay in 1836. In their official application, the leaders hoped that the inlet of Ensenada Honda would usher an era of prosperous agricultural exports. (Note: Here are the original words in the document. Spanish: Gran consuelo para el agricultor, con el aliciente de un puerto de mar tan próximo y pacifico conocido por el de la Ensenada-Honda, refugio de buques en tiempos borrascosos, por el que con facilidad pueden embarcarse los frutos tan luego como se habilite para ello.) In 1869, the Spanish colonial government began to pay closer attention to the bay with the planning of a lighthouse on Isla Cabras, which sits at the inlet's entrance. And between 1879 and 1889, it set the Ensenada Honda mangroves aside as a natural preserve (Spanish: Planes de aprovechamiento forestal). By the end of the century, Ensenada Honda had become the center of much economic activity around the timber, fishing and sugarcane industries. But, in 1905, the newly arrived U.S. Department of Agriculture saw it differently. It reported that "On the coast south of Fajardo and near to the village of Ceiba is one of the finest harbors in Porte Rico, which is wholly undeveloped. It is called the Ensenada Honda, and is landlocked, deep, and safe."

== Naval Base ==
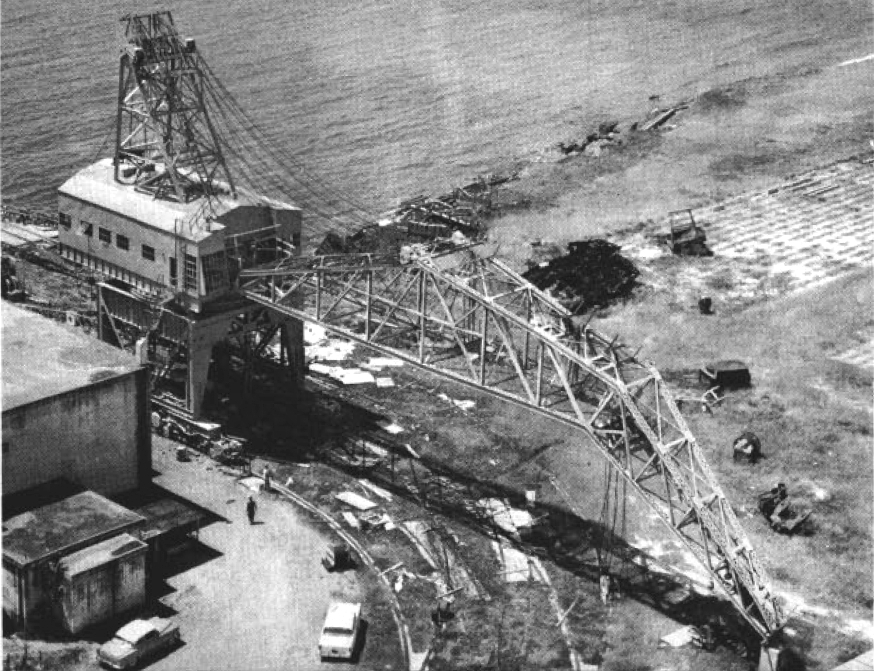
50t-capacity crane at Naval Station Roosevelt Roads PR c1963

The U.S. Navy interest in Ensenada Honda and the shorelines of Vieques and Culebra dates back to the 1898 Spanish–American War when U.S. warships rounded the island, and its officers took tactical notes of its contours. For the first time, the bay appeared in writing in reference to its potential for military use. In 1919, Lt. Robert L. Pettigrew conceived the idea of a naval complex on the eastern side that would go cross the Vieques Strait and connect Vieques and Culebra to mainland Puerto Rico through the Ensenada Honda in Ceiba. In May 1940, Captain R. A. Spruance, Commandant of the Tenth Naval District, referred to Pettigrew's 1919 report to request a fleet base in the Puerto Rico area. (Note: Differently from what a popular online version has it here, FDR did not visit PR in the 1919s (see here for the date of his visit) and it was not him who conceived the idea of the station on eastern PR. According to an official Navy document, the name of the officer who wrote the report and pass down the concept of the naval station that later developed into the RR base was Robert L. Pettigrew. Another author claimed his name was Alférez Pettigrew, instead. But the first is more likely.) The Second World War and the German submarine threat in the Caribbean gave the Navy the necessary incentive for its expansion designs. They meant the station at Ensenada Honda to grow into the "main fleet operation base in the Atlantic," and become the Navy's largest complex.

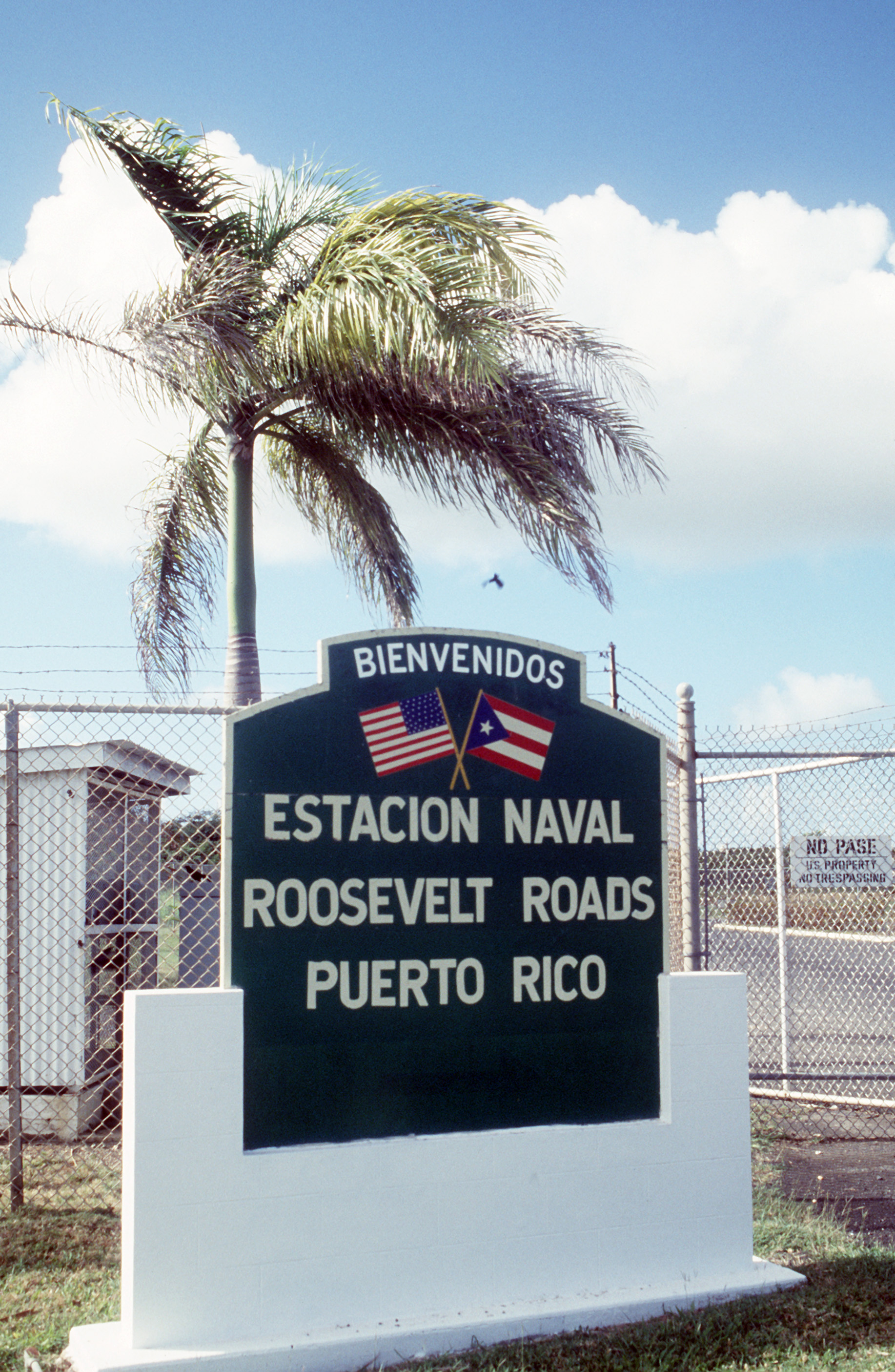
US Naval Station Roosevelt Roads entrance sign 1986

In 1939, President Franklin D. Roosevelt had appointed Admiral William D. Leahy governor of Puerto Rico and had charged him with preparing the island to assist the U.S. Navy in war preparations. The governor was to help draft local and federal legislations to appropriate the suitable lands for potential bases. The political and legislative groundwork for the acquisition of military terrain coincided with Puerto Rico's first agrarian reform, which facilitated the relocation of peasant families without property title and purchasing from small-holding owners. Soon after Pettigrew's 1919 report came back to light in 1940, the acquisition of the property around Ensenada Honda followed. An upsurge of jobs and a booming local economy accompanied the development. The construction pace seemed to move to the rhythm of the war news with Pearl Harbor staging the background. Puerto Rico could become the next target. Adding to the urgency, the Axis powers proved to be a menace indeed. And to the surprise of Puerto Ricans and U.S. observers alike, from April to May 1942, German submarines sank eight ships en route to Puerto Rico.

As quickly as the buildings rose from the ground, the economic boom deflated. It was not only about the dismissing of construction workers. The illusion of a sustained economic boom had facilitated mass expropriations. Ceiba's municipal government lost 8,500 of its 18,000 acres, about % 47 of its land. "In effect, Ceiba became a coastal community without a coast." Military installations now occupied Ceiba's finest farming plots and marine assets, in addition to extended stretches of crucial coastal land. The rapid development also evicted Over 4,000 of Ceiba's 18,000 residents from their homes, most of whom were agregados, families that had no legal title to their land, but held centuries-old traditional de facto rights instead. Other common malice accompanying the erections of military bases were the rapid, profound transformation of rural areas, including the growth of prostitution.

The Roosevelt Roads base closed in March 2004 under the Base Realignment and Closure (BRAC) program on that date Department of the Navy transferred its property on the eastern end of the island of Vieques, Puerto Rico to the administrative jurisdiction of the Department of Interior as required under the Floyd D. Spence National Defense Authorization Act for Fiscal Year 2001 (Public Law 106-398), as amended by Section 1049 of the National Defense Authorization Act for Fiscal Year 2002 (Public Law 107-107).

On January 29, 2007, the United States Environmental Protection Agency (EPA) entered into an Administrative Order on Consent (7003 - Consent Order) with the United States Department of the Navy. The Consent Order establishes the Navy's obligations for completing the cleanup of this large, closed military base, pursuant to the authority of the Federal Resource Conservation and Recovery Act ("RCRA"). The US EPA website (last updated December 2019) on the hazardous waste cleanup at the former Naval Base, designated as EPA ID: PR2170027203, the most significant current threats are adverse environmental impacts to the surface waters of Ensenada Honda and other marine bays and mangrove areas bordering the facility.

== Present day ==
In 2015, Puerto Rico's Department of Natural Resources received back from the federal government 70 acres around the cove for the protection of its natural resources.

== See also ==
- José Aponte de la Torre Airport
- Mayagüez Bay
- Fort Brooke, Puerto Rico
