= List of lighthouses in Puerto Rico =

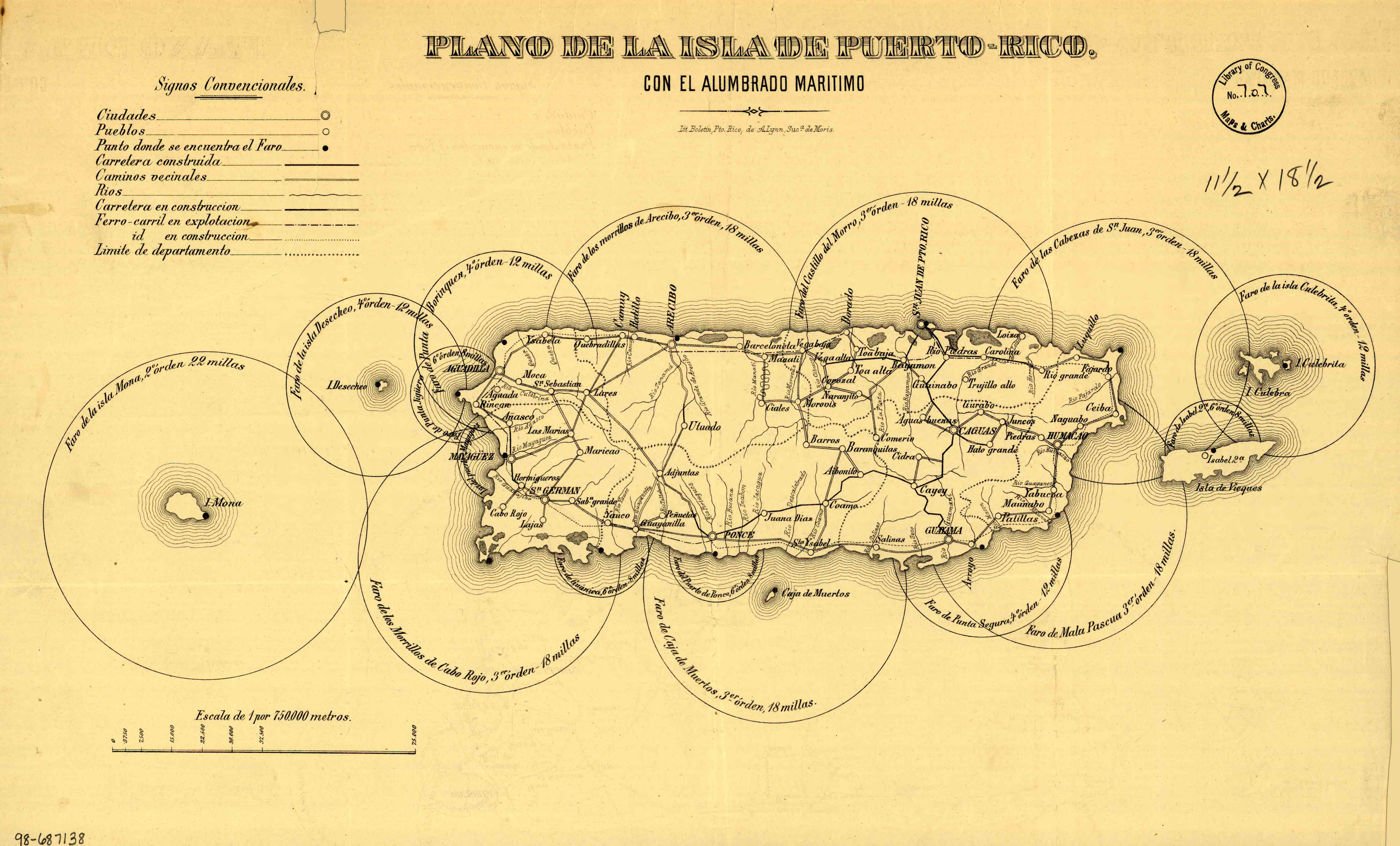
Layout of lighthouses in Puerto Rico as planned by the Spanish government, circa 1885

The lighthouses system of Puerto Rico consists of lighthouses that were built mostly during the last twenty years of the nineteenth century. These served as guides to important marine routes.

In 1869 the Spanish government approved the first plan for Puerto Rico in order to serve the ships that sail through its waters. The lighthouses are located in prominent and isolated areas with good visibility towards the sea. The classification system of the lighthouses of Puerto Rico was based on the characteristics of the lens, and the structure. The lights of the first and second order have a wider light to warn ships of the proximity to land, followed by the minor lights, whose scope was limited to smaller harbors and bays and to connect the primary lights in the system.

In 1898, the United States acquired the lighthouses of Puerto Rico as a result of the Spanish–American War. In 1900, the United States Lighthouse Board acquired responsibility for the aids to navigation. The lights are maintained by the Coast Guard since 1939.

In 1981, the lighthouses of Puerto Rico were listed in the National Register of Historic Places. In 2000, they were included by the Puerto Rican government in the National Register of Historic Properties of Puerto Rico.

The Coast Guard has been transferring responsibility of the lighthouses to local government and conservation organizations. Some of the lighthouses have been fully restored and are open to the public. In 2001, under the National Historic Lighthouse Preservation Act, Cape San Juan Light became the first lighthouse to be transferred to a non-governmental organization in Puerto Rico.

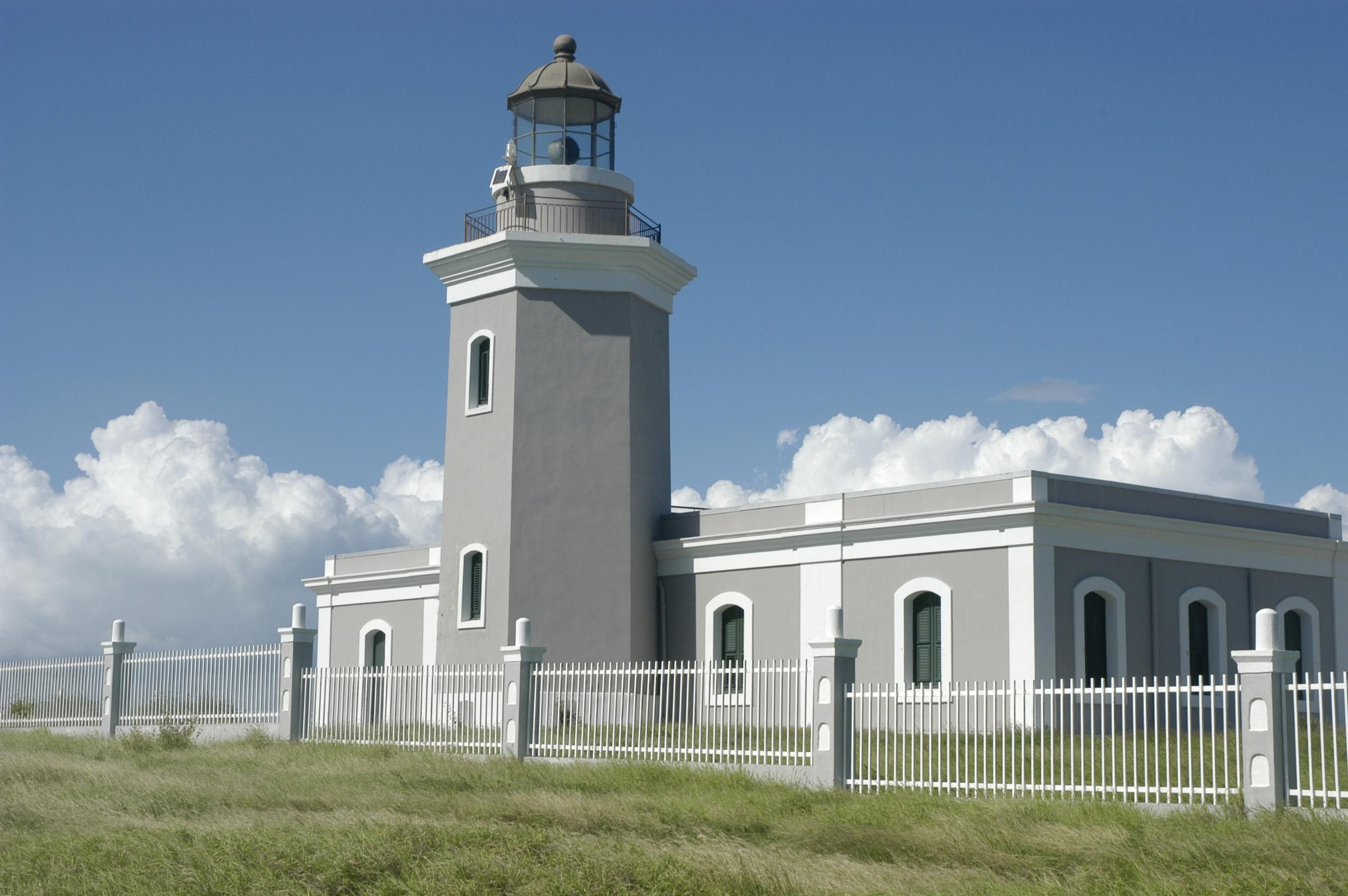
Los Morrillos Light restored by the municipality of Cabo Rojo

== List of lighthouses in Puerto Rico ==
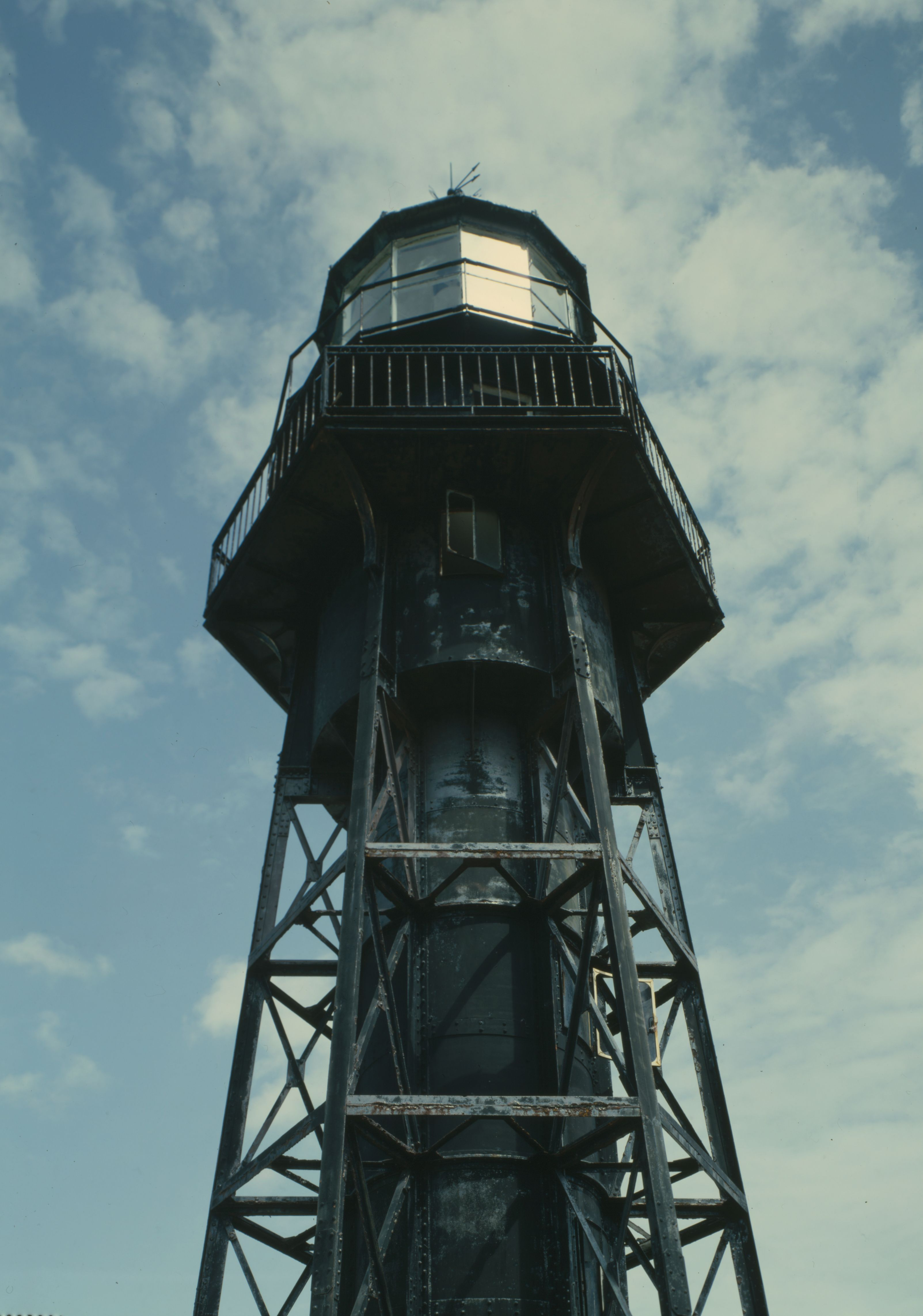
Mona Island Light was designed by Gustav Eiffel, the only lighthouse built of iron and steel in Puerto Rico.

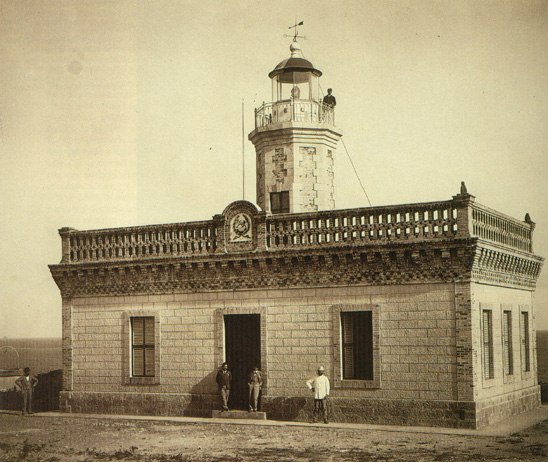
Guánica Light. The lighthouse is in ruins, though some parts of its unique architectural elements are still visible.

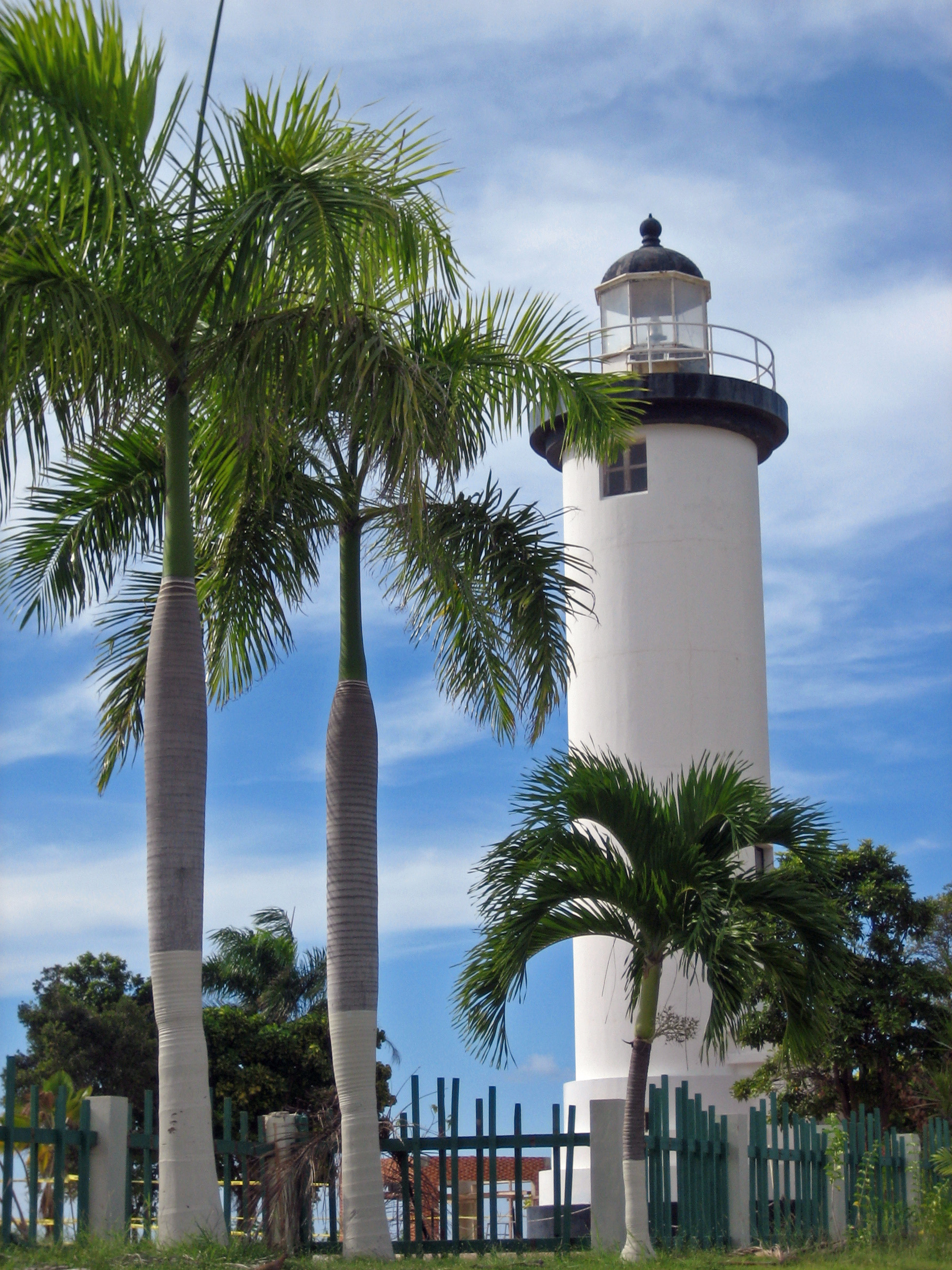
Punta Higuero Light, restored by the municipality of Rincón

The following is a list of lighthouses in Puerto Rico.

| Name | Municipality | Established | Tower height in meters (ft) | Focal plane in meters (ft) | Current status | Current condition |
|---|---|---|---|---|---|---|
| Los Morrillos Light | Cabo Rojo | 1882 | 12 m (40 ft.) | 37 m (121 ft) | Active | Restored for tourism |
| Punta Higuero Light | Rincón | 1892 | 21 m (69 ft) | 27 m (90 ft) | Active | It has been fully restored and is part of the El Faro Park, a tourist and recreation center. |
| Punta Borinquen Light | Aguadilla | 1892 | 18 m (60 ft) | 89 m (292 ft) | Active | Operational |
| Arecibo Light | Arecibo | 1898 | 14 m (46 ft) | 36 m (120 ft) | Active | Restored for tourism |
| Port San Juan Light | San Juan | 1846 | 15.5 m (51 ft) | 55 m (181 ft) | Active | Restored for tourism. Also known as El Morro, Faro de Morro or Faro del Castillo del Morro or Puerto San Juan Light. |
| Cape San Juan Light | Fajardo | 1880 | 14 m (45 ft) | 79 m (260 ft) | Active | Restored for tourism |
| Guánica Light | Guanica | 1893 | N/A | N/A | Inactive | Ruins |
| Cardona Island Light | Ponce | 1889 | 11 m (36 ft) | 14 m (46 ft) | Active | Good |
| Caja de Muertos Light | Ponce | 1887 | 19 m (63 ft) | 91 m (297 ft) | Active | Restored for tourism |
| Punta de las Figuras Light | Arroyo | 1893 | 15 m (50 ft) | N/A | Inactive | Restored for tourism. Damaged by Hurricane Maria, 9/20/17. |
| Punta Tuna Light | Maunabo | 1892 | 15 m (49 ft) | 34 m (111 ft) | Active | Restored for tourism. Damaged by Hurricane Maria, 9/20/17. |
| Mona Island Light | Mayagüez (Mona Island) | 1900 | 16 m (52 ft) | N/A | Inactive | Its condition is considered dire. Unless restored soon, many consider the lighthouse lost. |
| Punta Mulas Light | Vieques | 1896 | 10 m (32 ft) | 21 m (68 ft.) | Active | Restored for tourism |
| Puerto Ferro Light | Vieques | 1896 | N/A | N/A | Inactive | Abandoned and deteriorating rapidly |
| Culebrita Lighthouse | Culebra | 1886 | 13 m (43 ft) | 93 m (305 ft) | Active | In ruins |
| Isla Cabras Light | Ceiba | 1908 | N/A | N/A | Destroyed | Abandoned in 1965 and destroyed in 1966 |

== See also ==
- Lighthouses in the United States
- Lists of lighthouses and lightvessels
