= Punta de las Figuras Light =

Lighthouse in Arroyo, Puerto Rico

Punta de las Figuras Lighthouse
- Faro Punta de Las Figuras, c. 1898
- Location: Arroyo, Puerto Rico
- Coordinates: 17°57′17.92″N 66°2′51.56″W

Tower
- Construction: Brick and stone
- Height: 15 m (49 ft)
- Shape: Octagonal tower on dwelling
- Markings: White with w/o lantern
- Heritage: National Register of Historic Places listed place

Light
- First lit: 1893
- Deactivated: 1938
- Lens: Fifth order Fresnel 1893
- Faro de Punta de las Figuras
- U.S. National Register of Historic Places
- Puerto Rico Historic Sites and Zones
- Built: 1893
- Architectural style: Neoclassic
- Restored: 2003
- MPS: Lighthouse System of Puerto Rico TR
- NRHP reference No.: 81000687
- Added to NRHP: October 22, 1981

Punta de las Figuras Light (Spanish: Faro Punta de las Figuras) is an historic lighthouse located in Arroyo, Puerto Rico. It was first lit by the Spanish government in 1893. The light was relocated in 1938, and the structure was deactivated and abandoned. During World War II, the lighthouse was used as a lookout. After the U.S. Army abandoned the structure in 1963, the lighthouse was repeatedly vandalized. In 1969 the lens and lantern were destroyed. The lighthouse was again damaged by Hurricane Maria on September 20, 2017. The light housing is broken, all of the windows are boarded up, and several of the surrounding light pole fixtures are downed. The interior is currently inaccessible.

The lighthouse was listed to the U.S. National Register of Historic Places in 1981, and to the Puerto Rico Register of Historic Sites and Zones in 2001. In 2003, the Puerto Rican government rehabilitated it at a cost of two million dollars. The lighthouse is located at the entrance of the Balneario Punta Guilarte beach resort managed by the Puerto Rico National Parks Company.

== See also ==
- List of lighthouses in Puerto Rico
- National Register of Historic Places in Arroyo, Puerto Rico
