= Punta Mulas Light =

Lighthouse in Vieques, Puerto Rico

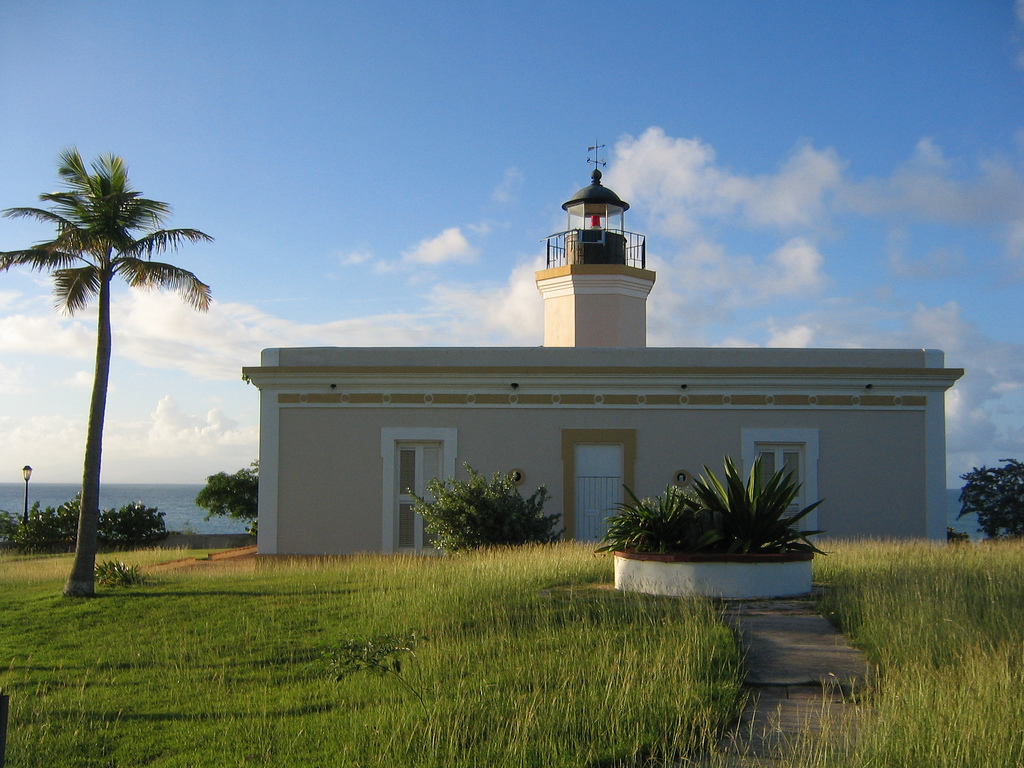
- Location: Vieques, Puerto Rico
- Coordinates: 18°9′16.1″N 65°26′37.8″W

Tower
- Constructed: 1896
- Foundation: Stone
- Construction: Brick and stone
- Automated: 1949
- Height: 10 m (33 ft)
- Shape: Octagonal on rectangular dwelling
- Markings: White with black lantern
- Heritage: National Register of Historic Places listed place

Light
- First lit: 1896
- Focal height: 68 m (223 ft)
- Lens: Sixth-order Fresnel
- Range: 7 nmi (13 km; 8.1 mi)
- Characteristic: Oc R 4s
- Faro de Vieques
- U.S. National Register of Historic Places
- Puerto Rico Historic Sites and Zones
- Architectural style: Neoclassic
- MPS: Lighthouse System of Puerto Rico TR
- NRHP reference No.: 77001551

Punta Mulas Light, also known as Faro de Vieques, is a historic lighthouse located in the north shore of Vieques, an island-municipality of Puerto Rico. It was first lit in 1896 and automated in 1949. Punta Mulas Light was the second lighthouse built on Vieques after the Puerto Ferro Light. The light was established to guide through the dangerous passage formed by a chain of reefs. It was of key importance for navigation in the San Juan Passage.

In 1992, the lighthouse was restored in celebration of the 500th anniversary of Christopher Columbus's first voyage to America. The structure houses a museum featuring the maritime history of Vieques and the Americas as well as other historical exhibits. It's listed in both the U.S. National Register of Historic Places and the Puerto Rico Register of Historic Sites and Zones.

== See also ==
- Puerto Ferro Light: also built in 1896 on Vieques
- List of lighthouses in Puerto Rico
