= Virginia Cardona =

Spanish volleyball player (born 1967)

Personal information
- Full name: Virginia Cardona Tapia
- Nationality: Spanish
- Born: 4 January 1967 (age 59) Barcelona, Spain

Virginia Cardona (born 4 January 1967) is a Spanish former volleyball player who competed in the 1992 Summer Olympics.
