= Puerto Ferro Light =

Lighthouse in Vieques, Puerto Rico

Puerto Ferro Lighthouse
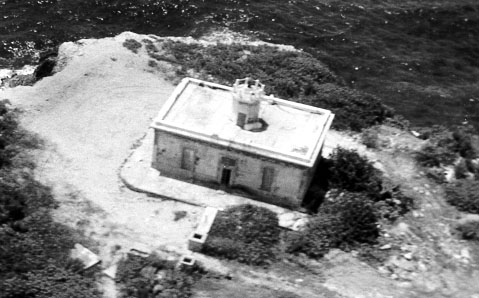
- Location: Vieques, Puerto Rico
- Coordinates: 18.096327°N 65.423821°W

Tower
- Construction: Stone
- Shape: Octagonal without lantern
- Markings: White

Light
- First lit: 1896
- Deactivated: 1926
- Lens: Fifth order Fresnel

Puerto Ferro Light, also known as Faro de Puerto Ferro, is a historic lighthouse located in the Vieques, Puerto Rico. The light was first lit in 1896. It is one of the last minor or local lights to be built by the Spanish government. The light was of crucial importance to cross the Vieques Passage. The lighthouse was deactivated in 1926 when it was abandoned.

During World War II, the United States military purchased about two thirds of Vieques as an extension to the Puerto Rican mainland's Roosevelt Roads Naval Station, including the area surrounding the Puerto Ferro Lighthouse. The US Navy continued to use the island for military exercises after the war. After a series of protests starting in 1999, the U.S. military ended the use of its facilities on the island in 2003. The Puerto Ferro Lighthouse is now part of the Vieques National Wildlife Refuge.

Although in poor condition and completely sealed in by brick or concrete, the structure is a good example of official neo-classic minor lighthouse style. The lighthouse is now open to the public, accessible by a gravel road which is immediately to the right of the gate upon entering the Refuge.

== See also ==
- Punta Mulas Light: also built in 1896 on Vieques
- List of lighthouses in Puerto Rico
