= Cardrona =

Cardrona can refer to:

- Cardrona, New Zealand, a locality between Wānaka and Queenstown
- Cardrona Alpine Resort, a ski field close to Cardrona
- Cardrona, Scottish Borders, a village in the Scottish Borders

== See also ==
- Cadorna (disambiguation)
- Cardrona (disambiguation)
