= General Cadorna =

General Cadorna may refer to:

- Luigi Cadorna (1850–1928), Royal Italian Army general
- Raffaele Cadorna (1815–1897), Royal Italian Army general
- Raffaele Cadorna Jr. (1889–1973), Royal Italian Army general
