= Ricardo Cardona (chef) =

Ricardo Cardona is a Latino chef in New York City who is the executive chef of Lua, Sofrito and Hudson River Cafe as well as the chef for the New York Yankees and their opponents during home games at Yankee Stadium.

== Career ==
Cardona started as a busboy and worked his way through the ranks at French and American restaurants in New York City. Cardona is the recipient of the 2007 Time Out New York Critic's Pick Best Bite Uptown - Way Uptown.
