= Maria Àngels Cardona i Florit =

Doctor Maria Àngels Cardona i Florit
- Born: 1940; Ferreries
- Died: 24 December 1991 (aged 50–51); Barcelona
- Education: University of Barcelona
- Scientific career
- Fields: Biology, Ecology, Botany
- Author abbrev. (botany): Cardona

Maria Àngels Cardona i Florit (1940, in Ferreries – 1991, in Barcelona) was a biologist, ecologist and botanist from Menorca, who worked mainly in Barcelona.

== Biography ==
She lived during her early childhood in Ciutadella (Menorca) before moving to Barcelona to go to university.

She studied Biological Science at the University of Barcelona and graduated in 1963. From 1964 to 1971, she completed her Doctoral thesis about the lifecycle of plants in different plant communities, basically around the Collserola area, in Barcelona. With this thesis, she started a new research line in geobotanics in Catalonia, which drove a significant change in scientific and methodology approaches. On 1972, she won the Pius Font i Quer Prize of Institut d'Estudis Catalans.

Ever since the beginning of her doctoral thesis, she worked as a professor at Barcelona University, and she was teaching in the Botanics Department from 1975 to 1985 when she moved to the Autonomous University of Barcelona. In 1986, she won a full professor position in Vegetable Biology that she held until her death.

She collaborated with different international professors, especially Juliette Contandriopoulos from the University of Marseille, an expert in Cytogenetics. She published more than fifty scientific papers and participated in the creation of the Menorca Encyclopedia. She was a member of National and International Societies and Commissions.

She had poor health and died from a stroke in Barcelona on 24 December 1991.

The standard author abbreviation Cardona is used to indicate this person as the author when citing a botanical name.

== Bibliography ==
- Marti Llufriu, J. Manel (1999). M. Àngels Cardona i Florit: La flora i el paisatge de Menorca. Maó: Institut Menorquí d'Estudis.
- "Maria Àngels Cardona i Florit", Dones de ciència, calendari 2007. En internet: http://www20.gencat.cat/docs/icdones/Documents%20web%20antiga/Arxius/pub_calendari2007.pdf.
