= Caja de Muertos Light =

1887 lighthouse in Ponce, Puerto Rico

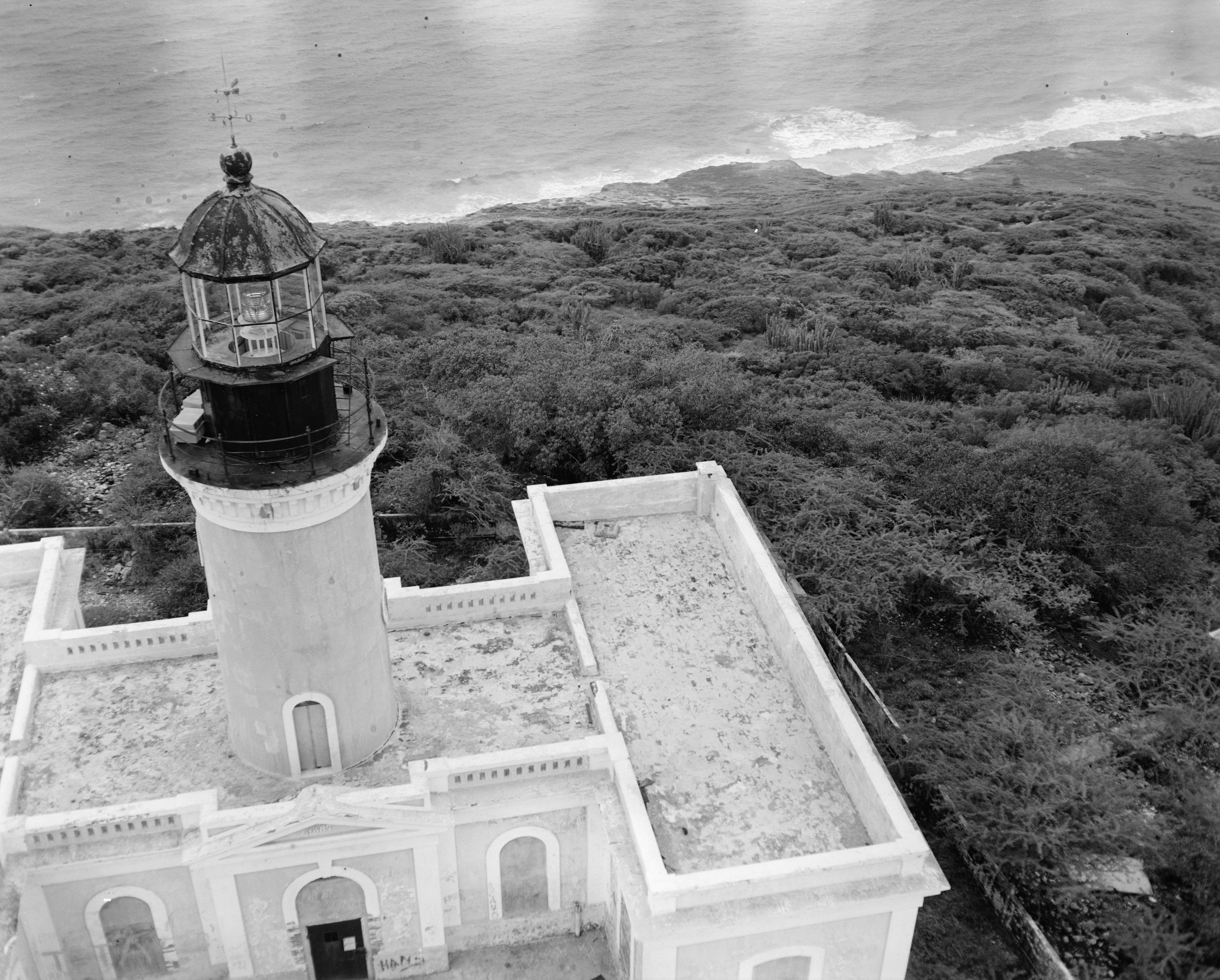
- Image taken in 1978
- Location: Ponce, Puerto Rico
- Coordinates: 17°53′35.37″N 66°31′16.28″W

Tower
- Constructed: 1887
- Foundation: stone base
- Construction: stone (Classical revival) tower
- Automated: 1945
- Height: 19 m (62 ft)
- Shape: cylindrical tower with balcony and lantern atop a keeper's house
- Markings: gray tower, black lantern
- Heritage: National Register of Historic Places listed place

Light
- First lit: 1887
- Focal height: 91 m (299 ft)
- Lens: Third-order Fresnel.
- Range: 18 nmi (33 km; 21 mi)
- Characteristic: Fl W 30s
- Faro de la Isla Caja de Muertos
- U.S. National Register of Historic Places
- Puerto Rico Historic Sites and Zones
- Architectural style: Neoclassical
- MPS: Lighthouse System of Puerto Rico TR
- NRHP reference No.: 81000690
- Added to NRHP: October 22, 1981

Caja de Muertos Light, (Faro de la Isla de Caja de Muertos) is an 1887 lighthouse in Ponce, Puerto Rico, that is unique amongst all other lighthouses in Puerto Rico for its unusual Cross of Lorraine, double-arm, T-type shape structure. The historic lighthouse is located on Caja de Muertos, an uninhabited island off the coast of Ponce, Puerto Rico. The light stands at the highest point of the island.

== History ==
The light was built in 1887 by the colonial government of Spain to serve as a 3rd order lighthouse. The original lighting apparatus was built by Sautter, Lemonnier & Company lens in 1885. In 1945 the lighting was automated. The lighthouse was restored by the Puerto Rico Department of Natural Resources and houses a lookout and a museum. In 2009, the government of Puerto Rico announced plans to make Caja de Muertos Island and this lighthouse a priority of the department.

The Faro de la Isla de Caja de Muertos is a major light and unique architectural structure within the Spanish Lighthouse system, as well as under American rule.

== Significance ==
The structure is important because it is unique amongst all other lighthouses in Puerto Rico in that it has an unusual Lorraine cross, double-arm, T-type shape. The light is somewhat similar to the Isla Culebrita Light "but, in itself, is a major example of a variation within the central theme of utilitarian functions and aesthetical interpretation."

== Architectural style ==
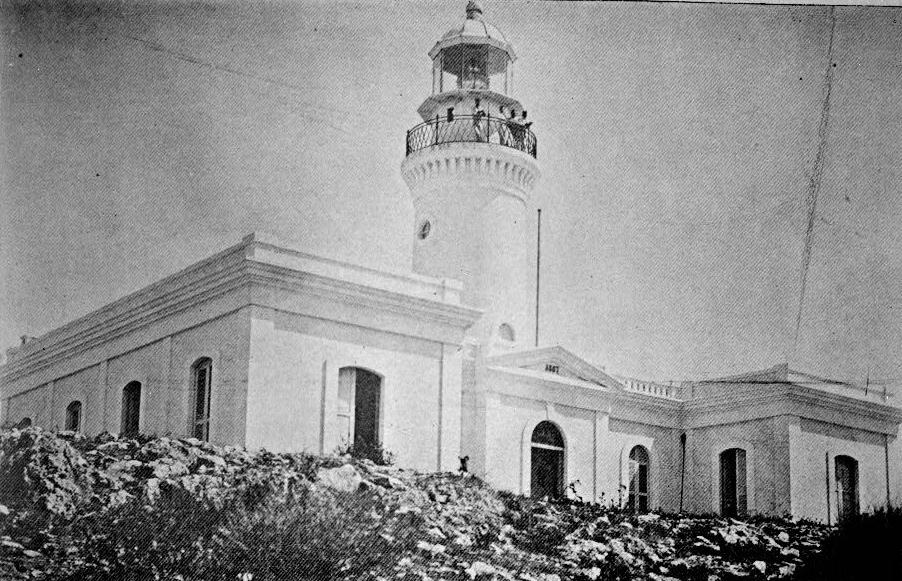
Image undated ca. 1898 from "Album de Puerto Rico"

The light stands atop of the highest point of Caja de Muertos, Puerto Rico. The most catchy characteristic of the lighthouse is its unique and unusual Lorraine cross double-arm "T" shape.

Within this structure, the main entrance opens to a small vestibule. The vestibule in itself is a section of a 12 x 1 meter long corridor which led to the keeper's quarters. The entrance to the tower, which has a 3.9 meter square base located in the center of the structure, is across the main entrance. On both sides of the tower base there were two 4.74m x 4.55m rooms one which served as the engineer's room and the other as a storeroom. North of the tower base the oil room was located. This one measures 3.6m x 1.5m. Therefore, from west to east a structural connection is formed by the storeroom, towers' base, oil room, engineer's room, and the corridor. This section links the keeper's quarters. These were arranged into two parallel sections running north to south and oriented of identical dimensions.

In order of disposition, first, came the living room, measuring 4.9m x 3.4m, followed by two sleeping rooms, measuring 3.5m x 3.5m each, and a kitchen-dining area, also 3.5m x 3.5m. The last three rooms connected to an 8.9m x 1m long corridor which reached the bathrooms. Each living room had three windows, the kitchens have two windows, and the dormitories, storeroom, and engineer's quarters had one window each.

The tower is a massive cylindrical structure, of 19m high—including the lantern—by a 2.5m inside diameter. It terminates in rectangular bracket-supporters for the cement circular gallery and cast-iron balustrade that encloses the cast-iron, copper, and glass 3rd order lantern. A cast-iron spiral stairway also led to the lantern that had vertical bars.

The original illuminating apparatus was an 1885, lenticular 3rd order lens, manufactured by Sautter, Lemonnier & Company of France. The central drum measured 1 meter in diameter. It had six panels of which three were flashing panels. In each panel of the central drum there were seven elements; each panel above central drum had eleven prisms and four prisms below. The flashes were produced by the central revolving drum mounted on a chariot activated by a clock work system. The clock cord descended through the central column in the stairway. The mechanism was protected by a circular iron and glass case. The original light characteristic showed a white flash every 3 seconds and had an 18-mile range. In 1923 the light characteristics were changed. In 1945 the light was electrified. It was also changed into an automatic, unwatched light that exhibited the original characteristics. The structure was abandoned and boarded up. The lens was replaced by a 500mm lens. No record has been found which indicates that major structural changes or alterations were introduced in the dwelling. The decorative elements are purely neo-classic especially its cornices and pediment.

== See also ==
- List of lighthouses in Puerto Rico
- Playa (Ponce)
