= Marcel Cardona =

Belizean politician

Marcel Cardona is a Belizean attorney and former politician. He was named the Minister of Youth, Sports and Culture in Belize in 2008 by Prime Minister Dean Barrow. He remained in the position for 13 months.
