= Dead man =

Dead man or Dead Man may refer to:

- Someone who is dead (man or woman)
- Dead Man, a 1995 film written and directed by Jim Jarmusch
  - Dead Man (soundtrack), a soundtrack album for the 1995 film by Neil Young
- The Dead Man, a 1989 comic strip in 2000 AD
- "The Dead Man" (short story), a 1946 short story by Jorge Luis Borges
- "The Dead Man", a 1950 short story by Fritz Lieber
- "Dead Man", a gimmick used by retired professional wrestler Mark Calaway, best known by his ring name "The Undertaker"
- Deadman, a fictional character in DC Comics
- "Dead Man" (The Games), a 1998 television episode

== Music ==
- Dead Man (band), a psychedelic rock band from Sweden
  - Dead Man (album), its self-titled album, released in 2006
- "Dead Man" (Alessia Cara song), 2024
- "Dead Man" (Self song), 2000
- "Dead Man", a song by James from their album Wah Wah
- "Dead Man", a song by M. Ward from his album Transfiguration of Vincent
- "Dead Man", a song by Pearl Jam from their album Lost Dogs
- "Dead Man (Carry Me)", a song by Jars of Clay from their album Good Monsters

== See also ==
- Deadman (disambiguation)
- Dead Man's Blood
- Dead Man's Chest (disambiguation)
- Dead Man's Curve (disambiguation)
- Dead man's hand (disambiguation)
- Deadman's Island (disambiguation)
- Dead man's switch (disambiguation)
- Dead Man's Statute
- Dead Man Walking (disambiguation)
- Dead Guy (disambiguation)
