= Dead Man's Chest Island =

Dead Man's Chest Island may refer to:

- Dead Chest Island, British Virgin Islands (also called Dead Man's Chest Island), in the British Virgin Islands
- Isla de Caja de Muertos, Puerto Rico (also called Dead Man's Chest Island), in Puerto Rico
- Pelegosto, a fictional island hosting a prominent part of the action of Pirates of the Caribbean: Dead Man's Chest

== See also ==
- Dead Man's Chest (disambiguation)
- Deadman's Island (disambiguation)
- Dead Man (disambiguation)
