= Dead Man's Chest (disambiguation) =

"Dead Man's Chest" is a 19th-century fictional sea shanty.

Dead Man's Chest may also refer to:

- Dead Chest Island, British Virgin Islands, in the British Virgin Islands
- Caja de Muertos, or Dead Man's Chest Island in Puerto Rico
- "Dead Man's Chest", a song by Parkway Drive from Horizons
- Pirates of the Caribbean: Dead Man's Chest, a 2006 film
  - Pirates of the Caribbean: Dead Man's Chest (soundtrack), soundtrack for the film
  - Pirates of the Caribbean: Dead Man's Chest (video game), an action-adventure game based on the film
- Dead Man's Chest (1965 film), a British second feature film

== See also ==
- Dead Man's Chest Island (disambiguation)
- Dead Man (disambiguation)
