= Island of Death (disambiguation) =

Island of Death may refer to:

== Places ==
- Ada Ciganlija, Sava River, Belgrade, Serbia; nicknamed "Island of Death"
- Sentosa Island, Singapore; formerly named Pulau Blakang Mati (Island of Death)
- Goli Otok Prison, Goli Otok Island, Croatia, Yugoslavia; a former prison nicknamed the "Island of Death"
- Pamanzi, Mayotte, Department of Mayotte, French East Africa, France; nicknamed the "Island of Death" (جزيرة الموت Jazīrat al-Mawt)
- Nazino Island, Alexandrovsky District, Tomsk Oblast, Russia; nicknamed "Island of Death", the location of the Nazino tragedy
- Nāves sala (Island of Death), Latvia, Empire of Russia; a WWI battlefield, see History of Latvia

=== Fictional locations ===
- Island of Death, a fictional location in the TV serial The Dominators, a 1968 Second Doctor Doctor Who adventure
- Island of Death, a fictional location in the Japanese anime and manga Kuroshitsuji, based on the Island of the Dead (paintings)
- Isla del Morte (Island of Death), Seattle; a fictional location found in House of the Dead (film)

== Literature ==
- Island of Death (novel), a 2005 Third Doctor and Sarah Jane Smith Doctor Who adventure novel by Barry Letts
- The Island of Death (novel), a 1920 novel in the Sexton Blake mystery series; see Sexton Blake bibliography part 2: 1912-1945
- "Island of Death" (arc), a story arc in the British comic book Commando (comics)
- Island of Death (story, Shi no Shima, 死の島), a 1951 short story by Yukio Mishima; see Yukio Mishima bibliography

== Radio plays ==
- "Island of Death" (episode), a 1941 season 1 number 49 episode of the U.S. radio play Inner Sanctum Mysteries; see List of Inner Sanctum episodes
- "Island of Death" (episode), a 1985 episode 82 of the U.S. radio play Doc Savage; see List of Doc Savage radio episodes
- "Island of Death" (episode), a 2000 season 1 number 1 episode 1 of the U.S. radio play Tales from the Crypt (radio series)
- "Island of Death" (episode), a 2013 series 9 number 3 episode of the UK radio play Jago & Litefoot

== Stage and screen ==
- Island of Death (film), a 1976 Greek exploitation horror film re-released in 1979 as "Island of Death"
- "Island of Death" (episode, 《죽음의 섬》), a 1980 episode 14 of the North Korean TV miniseries Unsung Heroes
- "Island of Death" (episode), a 2014 season 2 number 7 episode of the TV reality survival competition show Dude, You're Screwed
- Dodeneiland (Island of Death), a 1983 stage dance by choreographer Toer van Schayk

== Other uses ==
- Island of Death (videogame), a 1983 videogame by Ocean Software
- Island of Death: The Invasion of Malta, 1942 (boardgame), a 2006 board game; see List of board wargames
- The Island of Death (painting), a 1901 painting by Ferdinand Keller (painter)

== See also ==
- Isle of Death, a 1926 musical composition by Mark Wessel (composer)
- Isle of Death, a fictional location in game HackMaster
- Isle of Death, a fictional location in the 2017 film Hochelaga, Land of Souls
- Island of the Dead (disambiguation)
- Isle of the Dead (disambiguation)
- Death Island (disambiguation)
- Dead Island (series), a videogame series
