= Death Island (disambiguation) =

Death Island is the nickname of Shark Island, Namibia, where a prisoner camp was located.

Death Island or variant may also refer to:

== Places ==
- Cheung Chau, Hong Kong, China; an island nicknamed "Death Island" by the HK press
- Ko Tao, Chumphon Archipelago, Thailand; a resort island nicknamed "Death Island" by the UK press for the Koh Tao murders
- Kalmasaari (also called Death Island), Lake Vuokkijarvi, Karelia, Russia
- Nazino Island, Alexandrovsky District, Tomsk Oblast, Russia; nicknamed "Death Island", the location of the Nazino tragedy
- Shark Island concentration camp, German Southwest Africa; where the German Empire kept prisoners of ethnic cleansing during the colonial rebellion for the purposes of genocide
- Death Island, Mudyag Island, Mudyuga, Onezhsky District, Arkhangelsk Oblast, Russia; a British WWI concentration camp, see List of concentration and internment camps
- Death Island; a WWI battlefield in Latvia, Daugmale Parish

=== Fictional locations ===
- Death Island, a fictional location found in the Japanese anime Mnemosyne
- Death Island, a fictional location found in Aqua Teen Hunger Force U.S. animated TV show; see Aqua Teen Hunger Force
- Death Island, a fictional location found in Equinox
- Death Island, a fictional location found in Heavy Metal Thunder

== Film ==
- Resident Evil: Death Island, an animated horror-action film
- The Island (2018 Nigerian film), originally called "Death Island"
- Death Island (film), a horror film directed by Tom Savini

== Literature ==
- Death Island (novel), a 1984 novel by David Hagberg, part of the Nick Carter-Killmaster novel series
- Death Island (novel; Mrityudweep, মৃত্যুদ্বীপ), a 2014 novel in the Masud Rana series
- "Death Island" (chapter), chapter 361 of Case Closed (Detective Conan); see List of Case Closed volumes (21–40)

== Other uses ==
- Death Island (radio), a 2002 radio play directed by Ingmar Bergman; see List of stage productions directed by Ingmar Bergman

== See also ==
- Island of Death (disambiguation)
- Island of the Dead (disambiguation)
- Isle of the Dead (disambiguation)
- Dead Island (series), a videogame series
