= Dead man's switch (disambiguation) =

A dead man's switch is a device used as a fail-safe.

Dead man's switch may also refer to:

- Dead Man's Switch (audio drama), based on the British television series Doctor Who
- "Dead Man's Switch" (The Outer Limits), an episode of The Outer Limits
- "Deadman Switch", an episode of Stargate SG-1
- Dead Man's Switch: A Crypto Mystery, 2021 Canadian documentary film

== See also ==
- Dead Hand (disambiguation)
- Dead Man (disambiguation)
