= Hand of Glory (disambiguation) =

A Hand of Glory is the dried and pickled hand of a man who has been hanged.

Hand of Glory may also refer to:

== Music ==
- Hand of Glory (album), a 2002 album by Royal Trux
- Hands of Glory, a 2012 album by Andrew Bird
- "Hand of Glory", a song by Rage on their 1986 album Reign of Fear
- "Hand of Glory", a song by Strike Anywhere on their 2009 album Iron Front
- "Hand of Glory", a song by The Smithereens on their 1986 album Especially for You
- "Hand of Glory", a song by Witch on their 2006 eponymous album Witch
- The Hand of Glory EP, a 1983 EP by Ramleh

== Other uses ==
- The Hand of Glory, a 2002 Australian novel
- "Hand of Glory", a Cthulhu Mythos short story by Laird Barron
- "Hand of Glory", an episode of the American television series Graceland
- The Hand of Glory, a 2020 video game by Madit Entertainment and Daring Touch

== See also ==
- Dead man's hand (disambiguation)
