= Dead Guy =

Dead Guy may refer to:

- The Dead Guy, a satirical play by Eric Coble
- Deadguy, a metalcore band
- Dead Guy Ale, a beer made by Rogue Ales
- "Dead Guy" a song from the Bad Boys soundtrack (1995)
- "Dead Guy" a song from the Ministry album Filth Pig (1996)
- "Dead Guy", an episode from the first season of Malcolm & Eddie

== See also ==
- Dead man (disambiguation)
- Deadman (disambiguation)
