= Dead Man's Curve (disambiguation) =

Dead Man's Curve is a nickname for a stretch of road that has claimed a number of lives.

Dead Man's Curve may also refer to:

- Dead Man's Curve (1928 film), a silent American film
- Dead Man's Curve, alternative name for The Curve (1998 film)
- "Dead Man's Curve" (song), a song by Jan & Dean
  - Deadman's Curve, a 1978 Jan & Dean biopic
- Dead Man's Curve (band), a London surf music band
- "Dead Man's Curve", a song by Brothers Osborne on their album Skeletons (Brothers Osborne album)
- "Dead Man's Curve", a song by Eddie Meduza on his album West a Fool Away
- Dead man's curve, height–velocity diagram, which is a graph that charts safe/unsafe flight profiles relevant to a specific helicopter
