= Full Petal Jacket =

Album by The Surfin' Lungs

Studio album by The Surfin' Lungs
- Released: 2010
- Genres: Surf, punk pop
- Label: Wild Punk
- Producer: Surfin' Lungs

Full Petal Jacket is the seventh album by the surf music band The Surfin' Lungs, released in 2010 on the Spanish label Wild Punk Records. The album features a rare lead vocal bassist Steve Dean, who wrote After All This Time about his wife. All 14 tracks are self-penned continuing in the surf, sun, and girls style for which the Lungs are renowned. Lacking the harder, punkier edge of Surf, Drags, Full Petal Jacket is a prime example of how to execute surf pop.

== Track listing ==
1. Surf Bus (Dean, Pearce, Gilling, Weazel) – Lead vocals: Chris Pearce
2. Let's Have A Beach Party (Dean, Pearce, Gilling, Weazel) – Lead vocals: Clive Gilling
3. The Girls Gone Wild (Dean, Pearce, Gilling, Weazel) – Lead vocals: Chris Pearce
4. 97XF11 (Dean, Pearce, Gilling, Weazel) – Instrumental
5. Out On The Corner (Dean, Pearce, Gilling, Weazel) – Lead vocals: Chris Pearce
6. Talk Of The Locker Room (Dean, Pearce, Gilling, Weazel) – Lead vocals: Chris Pearce
7. After All This TIme (Dean, Pearce, Gilling, Weazel) – Lead vocals: Steve Dean
8. Bubblegum Summer (Dean, Pearce, Gilling, Weazel) – Lead vocals: Clive Gilling
9. The Dance With No Name (Dean, Pearce, Gilling, Weazel) – Lead vocals: Chris Pearce
10. Umgawa (Dean, Pearce, Gilling, Weazel) – Instrumental
11. Perfect Summer (Dean, Pearce, Gilling, Weazel) – Lead vocals: Chris Pearce
12. Storm Warning (Dean, Pearce, Gilling, Weazel) – Lead vocals: Chris Pearce
13. She's A Surf Punk (Dean, Pearce, Gilling, Weazel) – Lead vocals: Chris Pearce
14. The Surf's Up (Dean, Pearce, Gilling, Weazel) – Lead vocals: Chris Pearce

== Personnel ==
- Chris Pearce – vocals, guitar
- Steve Dean – vocals, bass
- Clive Gilling – vocals, guitar, keyboards
- Sputnik Weazel – vocals, drums, percussion

== Producer ==
- The Surfin' Lungs

== Trivia ==
- Former drummer Al Beckett plays the tambourine on "Bubblegum Summer".
- "Surf Bus" was one of the tracks reviewed on Spencer Leigh's Jukebox Jury programme on Radio Merseyside.
- The album was voted the third best release in 2010 on US radio station WITR-FM's Whole Lotta Shakin programme, while it was also record of the week on "El Sotano" on National Radio 3 in Spain.
