= Surf Factor 8 =

Studio album by The Surfin' Lungs
- Released: 2016
- Genres: Surf, punk pop
- Label: Redondo Records
- Producer: Surfin' Lungs

Surf Factor 8 is the eighth album released by surf music band The Surfin' Lungs, released in 2016 on Redondo Records. All bar one of the 14 tracks are self-penned, with Clive and Ray – back on drums – contributing one song each, while there is a cover of "Babysitter" by The Ramones. A traditional Lungs album, with songs about the sun, sea, cars and girls, with a surf punk edge and a hard driving bass prevalent throughout, plus a nod to several influences including The Beach Boys, Gary Usher, Blondie and The Ramones.

== Track listing ==
1. Bring On The Summer (Dean, Pearce, Gilling, Webb) – Lead vocals: Chris Pearce
2. Art Arfons (Dean, Pearce, Gilling, Webb) – Lead vocals: Chris Pearce
3. Don't Take My Baby (Dean, Pearce, Gilling, Webb) – Lead vocals: Chris Pearce
4. She Crashed The Prom (Dean, Pearce, Gilling, Webb) – Lead vocals: Chris Pearce
5. Beach Beat (Dean, Pearce, Gilling, Webb) – Instrumental
6. My First Car (Dean, Pearce, Gilling, Webb) – Lead vocals: Chris Pearce
7. Babysitter (The Ramones) – Lead vocals: Chris Pearce
8. Roadway Romeo (Dean, Pearce, Gilling, Webb) – Lead vocals: Chris Pearce
9. The Girl With The Joey Ramone Tattoo (Dean, Pearce, Gilling, Weazel) – Lead vocals: Clive Gilling
10. At The Weekend (Dean, Pearce, Gilling, Webb) – Lead vocals: Chris Pearce
11. Not That Kind Of Girl (Dean, Pearce, Gilling, Webb) – Lead vocals: Chris Pearce
12. Car Surfin' (Dean, Pearce, Gilling, Webb) – Lead vocals: Chris Pearce
13. I Saw The Sun Come Up In Her Eyes (Dean, Pearce, Gilling, Webb) – Lead vocals: Chris Pearce
14. My Favourite Barista (Dean, Pearce, Gilling, Webb) – Lead vocals: Chris Pearce

== Personnel ==
- Chris Pearce – vocals, guitar
- Steve Dean – vocals, bass
- Clive Gilling – vocals, guitar, keyboards
- Ray Webb – vocals, drums, percussion

== Producer ==
- The Surfin' Lungs

== Trivia ==
- Ray Webb's first album since Goin to Rockingham
- "At the Weekend" is only the second song written by Ray recorded by the group
- "The Girl with the Joey Ramone Tattoo" is sung and written by Clive
