= Dead man's hand (disambiguation) =

The dead man's hand is a two-pair poker hand of "aces and eights" allegedly held by Wild Bill Hickok at the time of his murder.

Dead man's hand may also refer to:

- Dead Man's Hand (video game), a 2004 first-person shooter
- Dead Man's Hand, a 2013 miniatures game by Great Escape Games
- Dead Man's Hand (1990), seventh in the Wild Cards book series
- Dead Man's Hand (2002 film), a 2002 film
- Dead Man's Hand (2007 film), a 2007 film
- Dead Man's Hand (2023 film), a 2023 film
- Dead Man's Hand, a 2014 literary anthology edited by John Joseph Adams

== See also ==
- Dead hand (disambiguation)
- Dead man (disambiguation)
- Dead man's fingers
- Dead Man's Handle, a 1985 novel by Peter O'Donnell
- Dead man's switch, a type of safety device
- Hand of Glory, made from a dead man's hand
