= Euphoria (Dead Man album) =

Studio album by Dead Man
- Released: March 31, 2008
- Recorded: June 2007 in Buffalo Bongo Studios, Örebro, Sweden
- Genre: Psychedelic rock, folk rock
- Length: 50:01
- Label: Crusher Records / Meteor City
- Producer: Daniel Ruud & Dead Man

Dead Man chronology
Dead Man (2006)	Euphoria (2008)

Professional ratings
Review scores
Source	Rating
allmusic	3.0/5 stars

Euphoria is the second studio album by Swedish psychedelic rock band Dead Man, released on March 31, 2008 by Crusher Records and Meteor City. The album received good reviews by Spin and Metal Review to name a few.

== Track listing ==
1. "Today" – 5:08
2. "High or Low" – 3:40
3. "Footsteps" – 5:30
4. "I Must Be Blind" – 5:05
5. "From A Window" – 0:56
6. "Light Vast Corridors" – 2:40
7. "The Wheel" – 9:13
8. "Rest In Peace" – 8:51
9. "A Pinch of Salt" – 3:30
10. "Euphoria" – 3:50
11. "July" – 1:36 (CD-only bonus track)

== Personnel ==
Dead Man

- Guitar, Mandolin, Percussion, Vocals - Kristoffer Sjödahl
- Guitar, Percussion, Vocals - Johan Rydholm
- Bass, Synthesizer, Organ, Guitar, Vocals - Joakim Dimberg
- Drums, Percussion, Vocals - Marcus Allard

Additional Personnel

- Engineer - Daniel Ruud
- Artwork By - Fredrik Fogelqvist
- Mastered By - Henryk Lipp
- Producer - Daniel Ruud, Dead Man
- Steel Guitar - Anders Haglund
- Violin, Flute - Mats Gavell
