= Island of the Dead =

Island of the Dead may refer to:

- Île des Morts, an island whose name translates as Island of the Dead
- Island of the Dead (1921 film), a German drama film
- Island of the Dead (1955 film), a West German drama film
- Island of the Dead (2000 film), a film directed by Tim Southam and starring Malcolm McDowell and Talisa Soto
- Island of the Dead (Sopor Aeternus and The Ensemble of Shadows album)
- Island of the Dead (painting), a series of paintings drawn between 1880-1901 by Swiss painter Arnold Böcklin
- Hart Island (Bronx), site of public cemetery, nicknamed by New York City locals as "The island of the dead"
- Kangaroo Island, known in Australian Aboriginal folklore as Karta, the island of the dead
- Prästö, Åland, an island formerly known as "The island of the dead"
- Survival of the Dead, a 2009 film directed by George A. Romero, originally titled Island of the Dead

== See also ==
- Isle of the Dead (disambiguation)
- Island of Death (disambiguation)
- Death Island (disambiguation)
- Deadman's Island (disambiguation)
- Dead Island (series), a survival-horror videogame series
