= Caja de Muertos Nature Reserve =

Nature reserve in southern Puerto Rico

- Reserva Natural de Caja de Muertos
- IUCN category V (protected landscape/seascape)
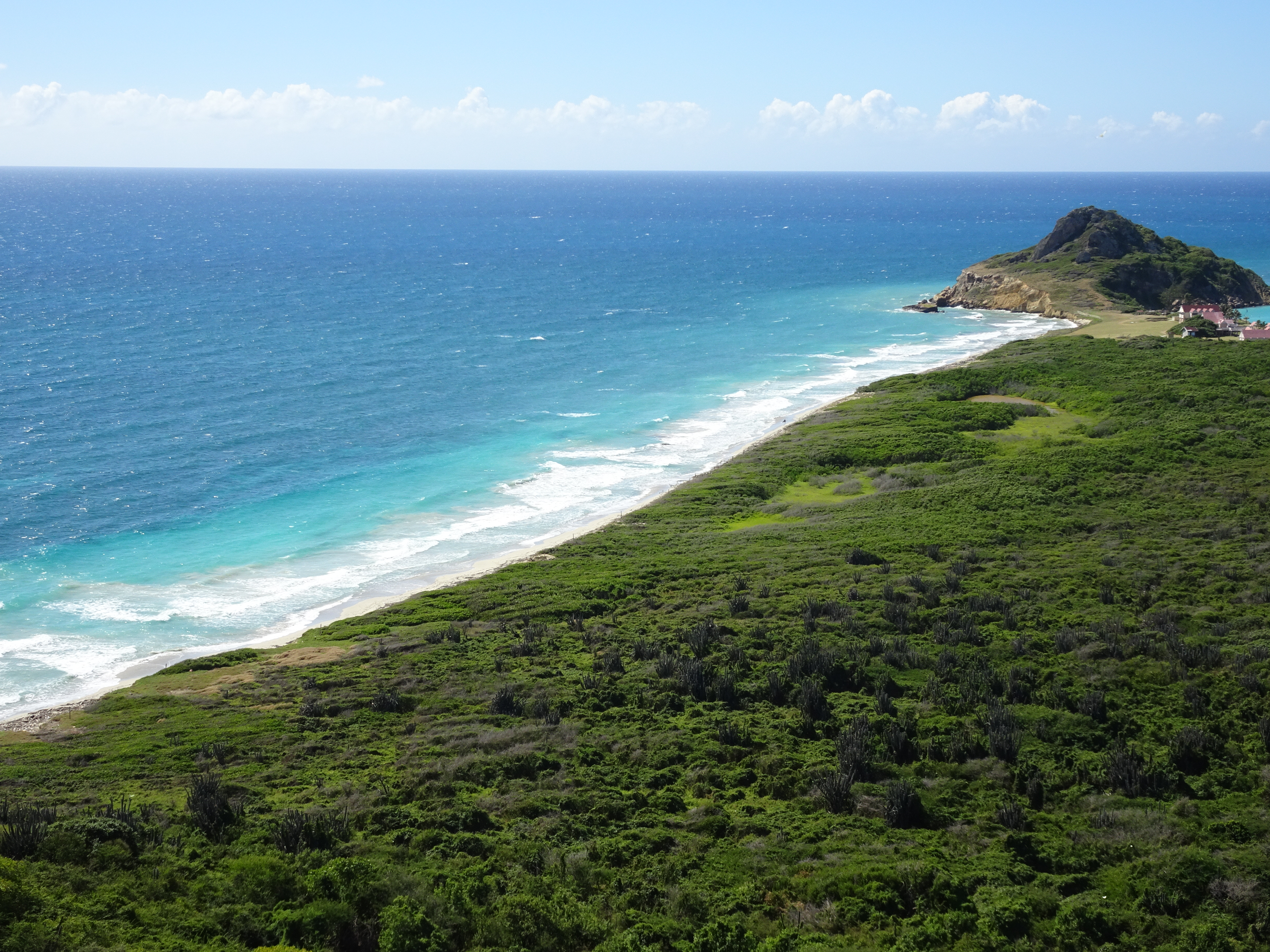
- Playa Larga Beach in Caja de Muertos

- Location within Puerto Rico
- Location: Juana Díaz and Ponce
- Nearest city: Playa, Ponce
- Coordinates: 17°53′41″N 66°31′8″W
- Area: 412 cuerdas (400 acres)
- Established: January 2, 1980
- Governing body: Puerto Rico Department of Natural and Environmental Resources (DRNA)

Caja de Muertos Nature Reserve (Spanish: Reserva Natural Isla de Caja de Muertos) is a nature reserve in southern Puerto Rico consisting of the islands of Caja de Muertos, Cayo Morrillito, Cayo Berbería, and their surrounding reefs and waters in the Caribbean Sea. This nature reserve was founded on January 2, 1980, by the Puerto Rico Planning Board (Junta de Planificación) as recommended by the Puerto Rico Department of Natural and Environmental Resources (Departamento de Recursos Naturales y Ambientales de Puerto Rico, DRNA) with the purpose of preserving the subtropical dry forest ecosystems found within these islands, some important sea turtle nesting sites, and the marine habitats found on their surrounding reefs and waters.

== History ==
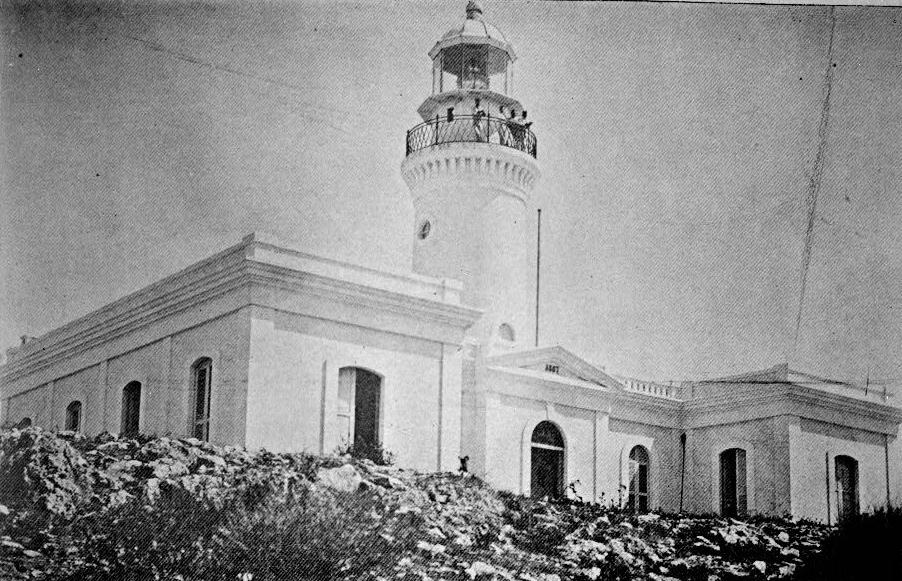
Caja de Muertos Lighthouse in 1898.

The name Caja de Muertos (coffin) literally translates "dead man's chest" from Spanish. The name most likely comes from the original French name for the island, Coffre à Mort, first given by 18th century French writer and explorer Jean Baptist Labat due to the island's shape. Although the island was never permanently populated, throughout its history it has served as a pirate hideout, a place for clandestine meetings for the island's Freemasons during the Spanish Catholic rule, and for secret gatherings of Puerto Rico independence movement leaders such as Ramón Emeterio Betances and Segundo Ruiz Belvis. Additionally, the presence of petroglyphs is evidence of the former presence of the Taíno people on the island. The other surrounding islands and keys show no evidence of historical human activity or population.

The Spanish built a lighthouse on the island in 1883, which was updated and automated in 1945. The island had no more human activity until the later part of the 20th century when some infrastructure, such as restrooms, gazebos and other buildings were built for visitors. The area was not formally protected until January 2 of 1980 when a proposal by the Puerto Rico Department of Natural and Environmental Resources (DRNA) to establish the island and surrounding keys as a nature reserve was approved by the Puerto Rico Planning Board. The island today is of ecological importance due to its preserved subtropical tropical dry forest; in addition to the Guánica State Forest this is one of the last tracts of its type in Puerto Rico and the Caribbean.

== Geography ==
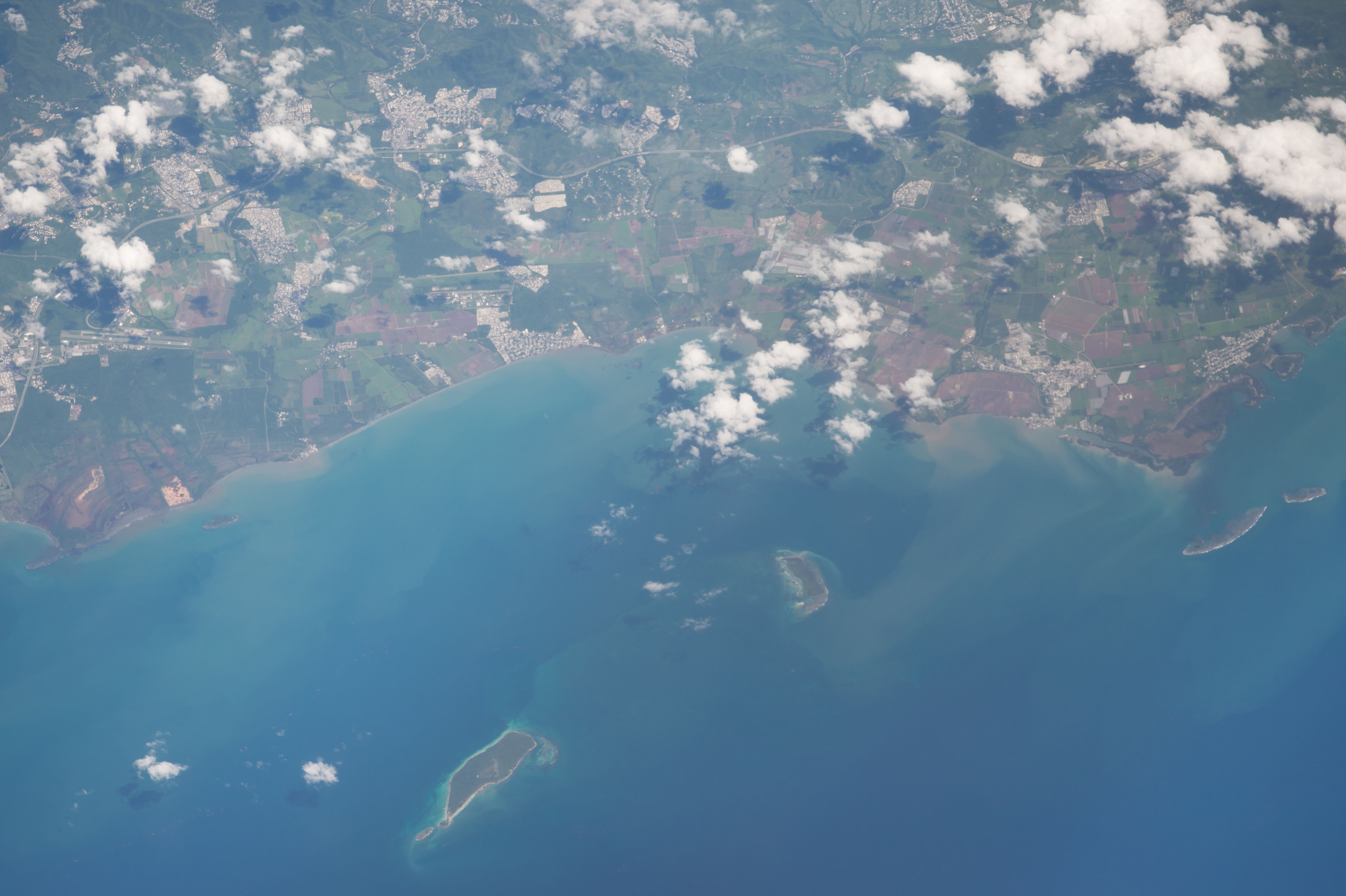
View of the nature reserve area from the International Space Station. The two largest islands are Caja de Muertos (west) and Berbería (east).

The nature reserve covers a land area of approximately 400 acres (412 cuerdas) and it includes the following islands and keys connected by shallow water banks:

- Caja de Muertos, with an area of 0.59 sq mi (1.54 km^{2}), is the largest island in the nature reserve. It is part of the Playa barrio of the municipality of Ponce. The island of Caja de Muertos is the main geographical feature of the reserve; it is located 4.8 nautical miles south of the coast of Puerto Rico.
- Morrillito, with an area of 0.015 sq mi (0.04 km^{2}), is a very small and rocky key located adjacent to Caja de Muertos. It is also part of the Playa barrio of the municipality of Ponce.
- Cayo Berbería (also known as Cayo de la Berbería and Cayo de Bizarreta) is a small key covered in mangroves and surrounded by coral reefs that is part of the barrio Río Cañas Abajo of the municipality of Juana Díaz.

The islands belonging to the Caja de Muertos Nature Reserve are part of a larger archipelago that extends off Puerto Rico's Caribbean coast from east to west. Some of these other southern islands include Cayo Cabezazos, Cayo Caracoles, Cayo Alfeñique, the Cayos Ratones and the Cayos Pájaros. Most of these keys are protected as part of the Punta Petrona Nature Reserve of Santa Isabel and the Jobos Bay Reserve of Salinas and Guayama.

The highest point in both Caja de Muertos and the nature reserve is the 240 feet (73 m) high unnamed hill where the Caja de Muertos Lighthouse is located. The island's geography also includes rocky cliffs, caves, a flat plateau that is home to an extensive tropical dry forest, a lagoon with mangroves, and a small promontory (morro) located on the southwestern-most point of the island, across from the small key of Morrillito (Spanish for "small promontory").

== Ecology ==
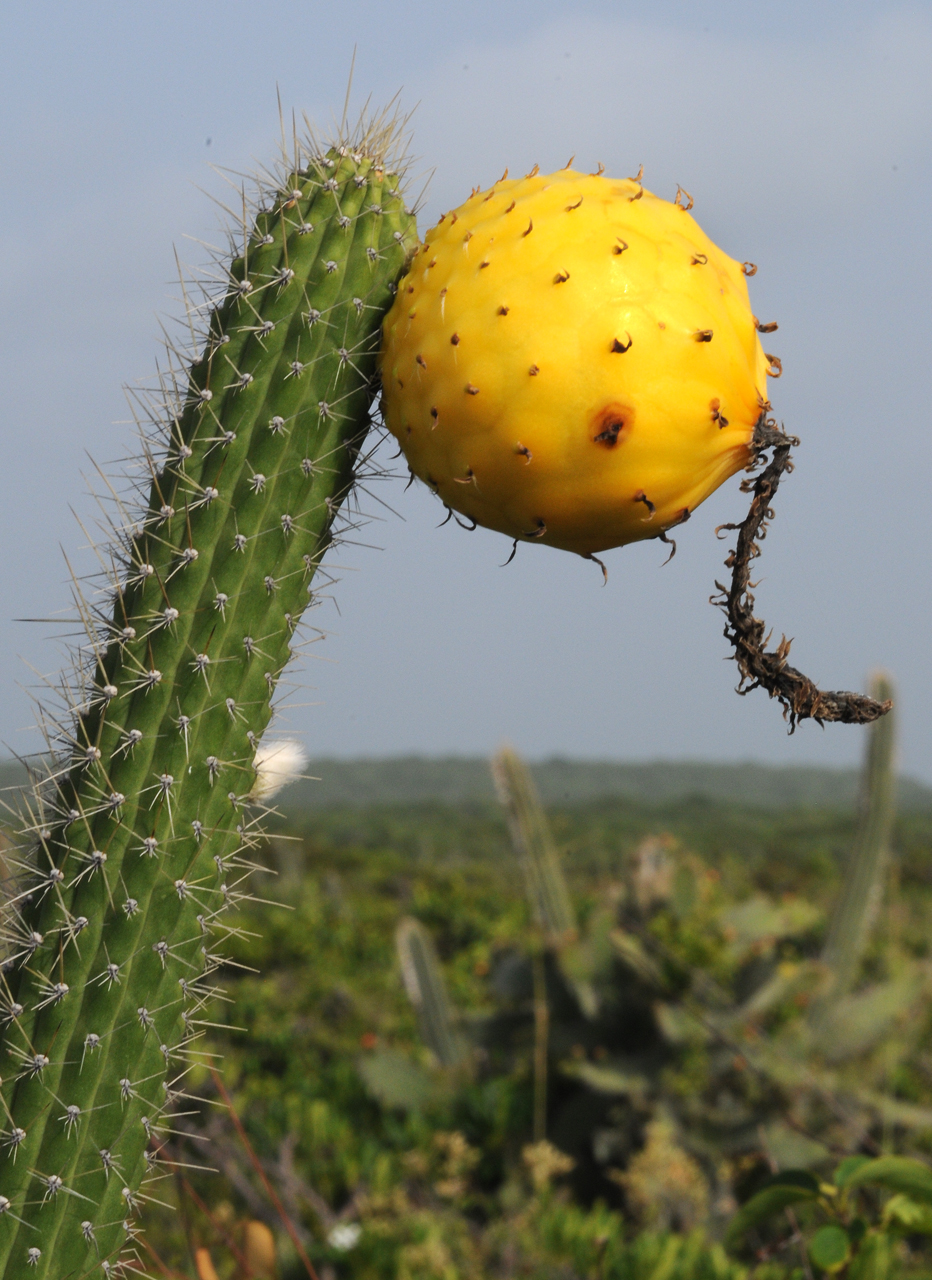
The critically endangered higo chumbo (Harrisia portoricensis) was introduced in Caja de Muertos by the DRNA.

The ecological diversity of the Caja de Muertos Nature Reserve includes mangrove forests, sandy shores important for sea turtle nesting, rocky coasts and cliffs which are important bird areas, caves and xerophytic (dry and thorny) forests. Due to the close proximity of Caja de Muertos and Berbería to land, most of the local species originate in the main island of Puerto Rico.

=== Fauna ===
This nature reserve serves as a shelter, nesting and feeding place for a number of species of birds and marine animals, in addition to many migratory and introduced species. Some notable bird species of the reserve includes brown pelicans, brown boobies, ospreys, roseate terns, least terns, and the endangered black-capped petrel. The only fully terrestrial species found in the islands are the common Puerto Rican ameiva (Pholidoscelis exsul), the threatened Puerto Rican blue-tailed ameiva (Ameiva wetmorei), and the Puerto Rican racer snake (Borikenophis portoricensis). At least two species of sea turtle nest in Caja de Muertos and Morrillito islands: green sea turtles (Chelonia mydas) and hawksbill sea turtles (Eretmochelys imbricata), which are endangered and critically endangered, respectively. Its coastal waters are further designated a critical habitat for the West Indian manatee (Trichechus manatus).

=== Flora ===
The flora that occurs in the Caja de Muertos reserve is similar to that found in the Guánica State Forest. Cacti and other xerophytic species are common throughout Caja de Muertos and Morrillito. The rest of the vegetation is deciduous and mostly covers areas that have limestone soil. Examples of rare or unique flora species found in the area include serpentine manjack (Varronia bellonis) and Portulaca caulerpoides, which are endemic to Puerto Rico. Other distinctive flora is the white and button mangrove on the sea-level mangrove basins, manzanillo de muertos or manchineel (Hippomane mancinella) in the drier areas, and algae and Thalassia on the seagrass prairies. The Puerto Rican applecactus (Harrisia portoricensis) is a critically endangered species of cactus from the Mona, Monito and Desecheo islands in La Mona Passage that was introduced to Caja de Muertos by the DRNA. It is locally known as higo chumbo, meaning "weighed-down prickly pear" due to the leaning cactus arms caused by the weight of their fruit.

=== Coral reefs ===
The coral reef area in the nature reserve is among the most expansive and most preserved in Puerto Rico. Most of the coral is found on the northeastern reefs along Caja de Muertos; it serves as home and nursery to numerous fish species.

== Recreation ==
Caja de Muertos can be reached by ferry from La Guancha Boardwalk in Playa de Ponce. The reserve is open to hikers and beachgoers; there are four beaches in the reserve: Pelicano Beach, Playa Larga, Carrucho Beach and Coast Guard Beach. Snorkeling is allowed in the reserve.

== Gallery ==
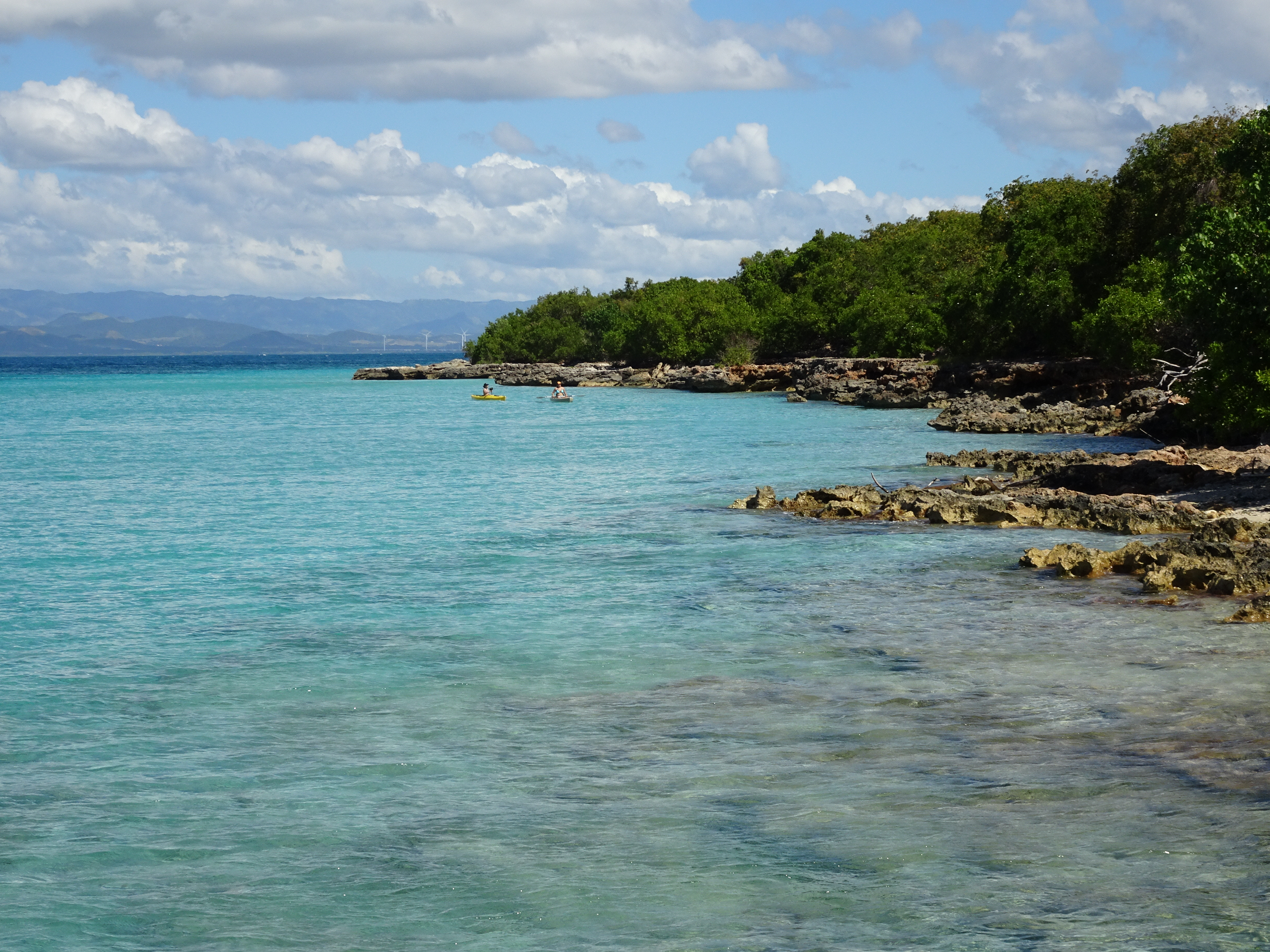
Coast Guard Beach in Caja de Muertos

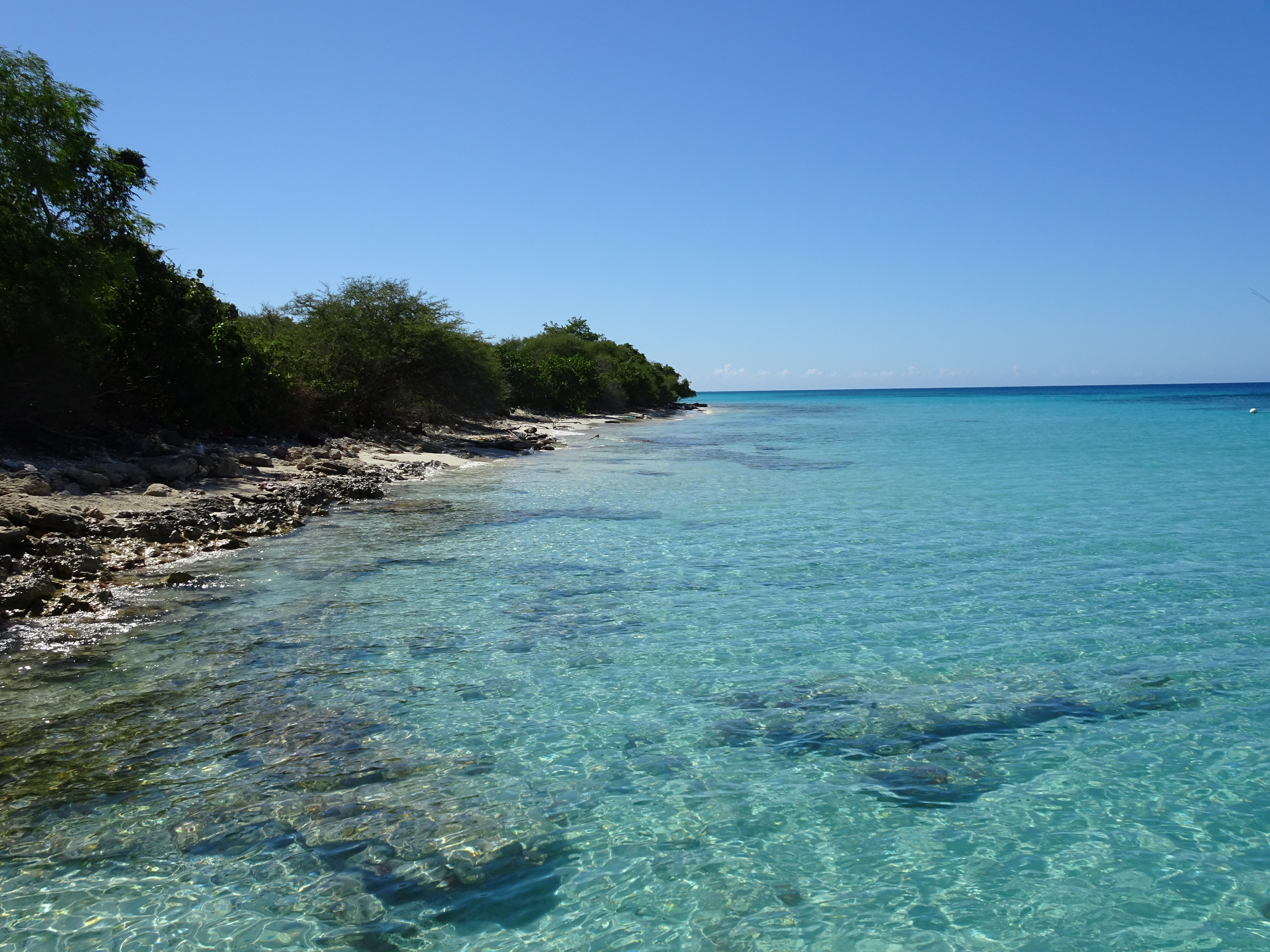
Reefs along the coast of Caja de Muertos.

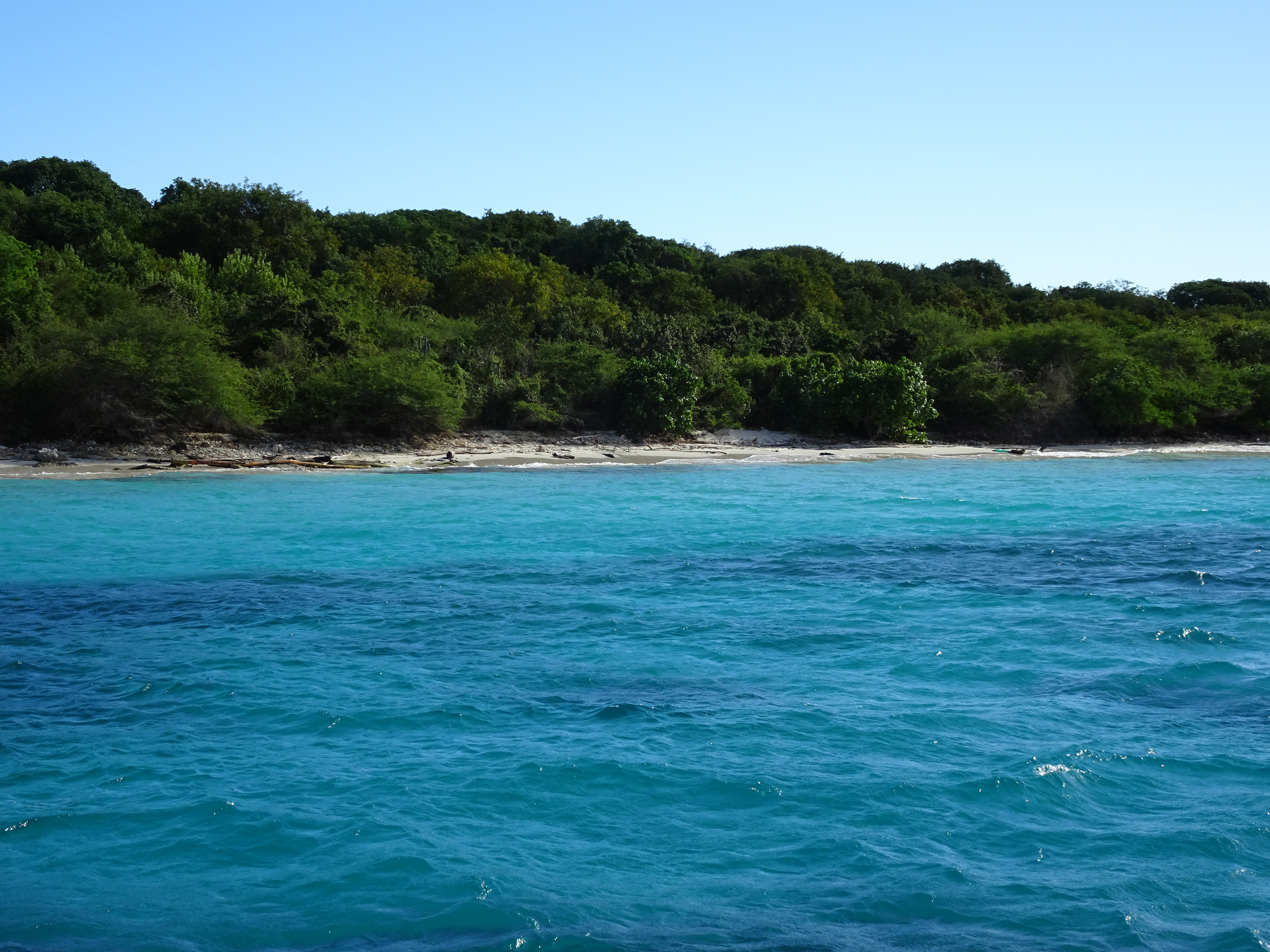
Carrucho Beach

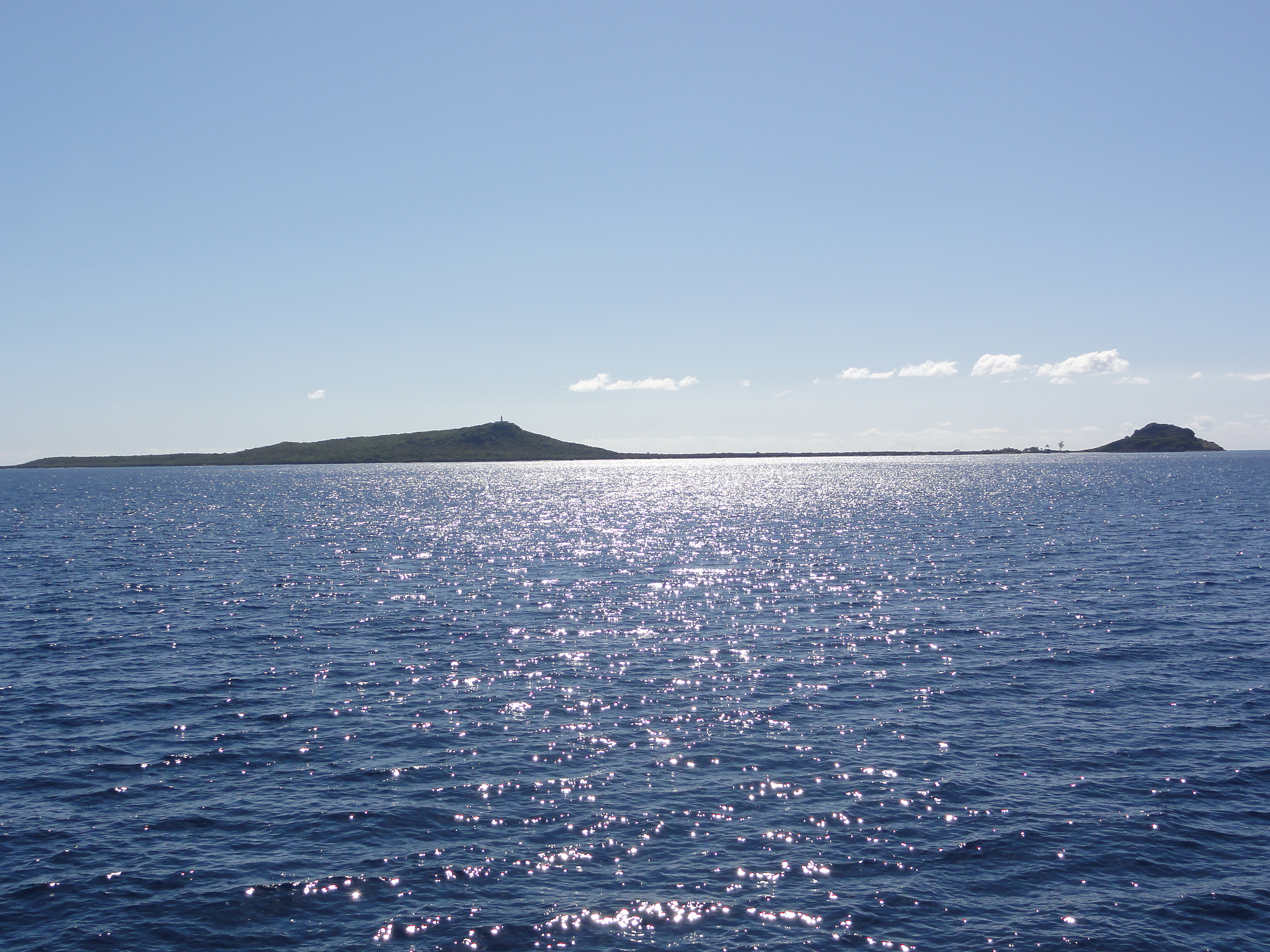
Caja de Muertos island from Ponce.

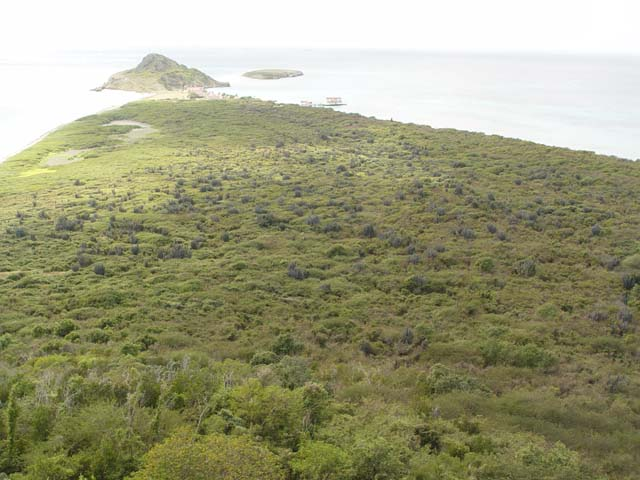
Dry forest in Caja de Muertos.

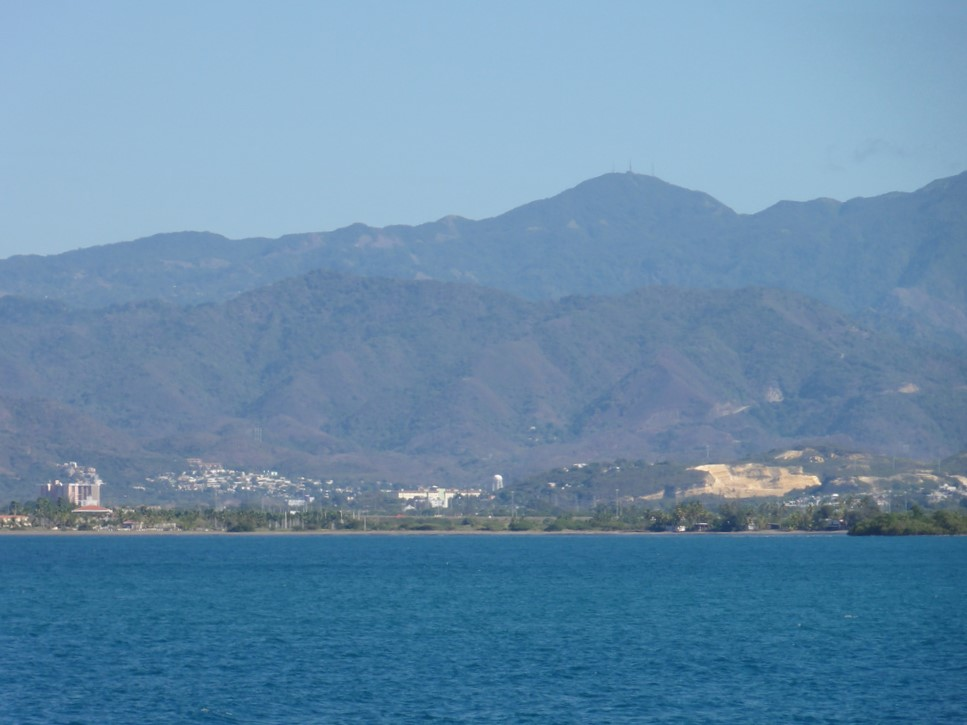
Ponce and Cerro de Punta from Caja de Muertos.

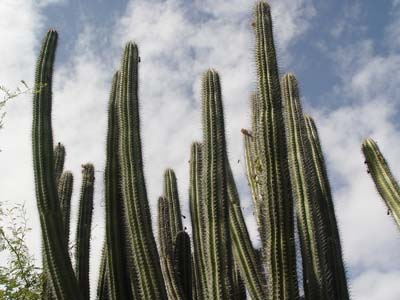
Cactus is common in the reserve.

== See also ==
- List of islands of Puerto Rico
- Protected areas of Puerto Rico
