= Deadman =

Deadman or Deadman's may refer to:

- "Deadman" or "dead man", alternative terms for a dead man's switch
- "Deadman's foot", another name for a Salamander in metallurgy
- "Deadman anchor", a buried object (log, concrete, block, etc.) used to anchor objects during construction, mooring, or other activities
  - Deadman (climbing), an anchor used in Alpine mountaineering, such as a snow fluke

== Places ==
- Deadman's Cay, Bahamas
  - Deadman's Cay Airport, an airport on the aforementioned cay
- Deadman's Cross, Bedfordshire, a location in England
- Deadman Islands
- Deadman's Island (disambiguation), a number of places of the same name
  - Deadman's Island (Nova Scotia)
  - Deadman's Island (San Pedro)
  - Deadman's Island (Vancouver)
- Deadman SSSI, Somerset, England
- Deadman Summit, California
- Deadman River, British Columbia

== People ==
- Derek Deadman (1940–2014), English actor
- The Undertaker (born 1965), professional wrestler, also known as The Deadman

== Media ==
- Deadman (character), a DC Comics character
  - Deadman (Vertigo), a 2006 comic series loosely based on the character
- Deadman (band), a Japanese alternative rock band
- "Deadman", a song by Australian progressive rock band Karnivool
- Deadman (album), an EP by House of Brothers
- "Deadman", a 1972 performance piece by Chris Burden
- Deadman's Curve, a 1978 American made-for-television biographical film

== See also ==
- Dead man (disambiguation)
