= Isle of the Dead =

Isle of the Dead may refer to:

- Isle of the Dead (mythology), a theme associated with pre-Christian Celtic mythology
- Isle of the Dead (Tasmania), is a cemetery on an island adjacent to Port Arthur, Tasmania
- Isle of the Dead (film), a 1945 horror film
- Isle of the Dead (Zelazny novel), a 1969 science fiction novel by Roger Zelazny
- Isle of the Dead (Rodda novel), a 2005 children's fantasy novel by Emily Rodda
- Isle of the Dead (Rachmaninoff), a symphonic poem
- Isle of the Dead (video game), a 1993 video game
- Isle of the Dead (Chill), a 1984 role-playing game adventure for Chill

== See also ==
- Isle aux Morts (French: Isle of the Dead), Newfoundland, Canada
- Isle of Death, a 1926 musical composition by Mark Wessel (composer)
- Isle of Death, a fictional location in game HackMaster
- Isle of Death, a fictional location in the 2017 film Hochelaga, Land of Souls
- Island of the Dead (disambiguation)
- Island of Death (disambiguation)
- Death Island (disambiguation)
- Deadman's Island (disambiguation)
- Dead Island (series), survival-horror videogame series
