= Dead Man's Curve (band) =

Dead Man's Curve is a London surf music band, named after the hit song by Jan and Dean. Started in 1995 they played classic London venues such as the Borderline and the 100 Club. They received regular radio plays on BBC Radio 1 (Mark Lamarr, Mark Radcliffe) and XFM, and have played with many of the surf bands including Jon & The Nightriders and The Surfin' Lungs.

== Members ==
- Buzz T. – guitar
- Dick Van – bass
- Django – guitar and theremin – Django is now heading up Los Fantasticos, a Brighton-based surf quartet whose album Return of the Leopardman, was released in November 2005.
- Gus – drums
- Johnny – organ

Although Johnny has moved to Toronto and Buzz T. to Sydney, the band still managed to record "In a Groovy Grave" via the internet for the Frankie Stein and The Ghouls tribute compilation in 2003, although this album never saw the light of day. Django and Gus played together in a band called The Ogdens in the 1980s.

== Discography ==
=== Albums ===
- We Will Prevail – Gorgeous Records 1999.
- World Catastrophe Generator – Gorgeous Records 1998.

=== Singles ===
- "Surfquake" – Gorgeous Records 1997.
- "Tombstone" – Gorgeous Records/Bandcamp 2018

=== Compilations ===
- Frankie Stein and The Ghouls tribute featuring the track "In a Groovy Grave" – K.R.E.E.P.Y. Records 2003
- The Missing Chord featuring the track "Charlie’s Point" – Snatch Records 1996
