= Dead Hand (disambiguation) =

Dead Hand is a Cold War-era Soviet/Russian weapons control system.

Dead hand may also refer to:

- The Dead Hand, a 2009 non-fiction book by David E. Hoffman
- Dead hand, or mortmain, the perpetual, inalienable ownership of real estate
- Dead Hand, a book series by Upton Sinclair, starting with The Profits of Religion
- "Dead Hand", a 1945 novella by Isaac Asimov, later renamed "The General" as part of Foundation and Empire (1952)
- "Dead Hand" (The Americans), a 2018 TV episode
- Dead hand (cards), a hand that is dealt but not used during a card game

== See also ==
- Dead hand control, also known as the rule against perpetuities, in common law property law
- Dead man's hand (disambiguation)
