= Dead man's fingers =

Dead man's fingers or dead men's fingers may refer to:

- Xylaria polymorpha, a species of ascomycetous fungus
- Decaisnea fargesii, deciduous shrub of the family Lardizabalaceae
- Alcyonium digitatum, a type of coral
- Codium fragile, a seaweed
- The gills of a crab
- The fruit of a Decaisnea
- Orchis mascula, an orchid with tubers that are sometimes finger-shaped
- Haliclona oculata, a demospongian poriferan may also be referred to as "dead man's finger"
- Oenanthe crocata
