= Dead Man (band) =

Swedish psychedelic rock band

- Origin: Örebro, Närke, Sweden
- Genres: Psychedelic rock, folk rock
- Years active: 2003–present
- Labels: Crusher Records; MeteorCity Records
- Members: Kristoffer Sjödahl; Jesper Mattsoff; Johan Fuxin
- Past members: Sebastian Gyllström; Mikael Olausson; Peter Lindström; Marcus Allard; Johan Rydholm; Jonas Askerlund; Joakim Dimberg
- Website: Dead Man on Myspace

Dead Man is a psychedelic rock band from Örebro, Närke, Sweden formed in 2003. The band’s sound is highly influenced by 1960s and 1970s psychedelic rock/folk rock as well as other musical genres.

== History ==
The band was started by Kristoffer Sjödahl (formerly of Norrsken) and Johan Rydholm. As the two jammed together a lot, they then asked Marcus Allard to join which he said yes and later that year bass player Joakim Dimberg joined to complete the band. The band’s name arose from an album by Texas rock band Josefus which was entitled Dead Man. Dead Man initially released a vinyl 7” containing two songs, "Ship Ahoy!" and "Thousand Mile Stare", recorded in a basement in the rural town of Kumla. The two songs created a buzz among stoners and hippies in the underground scene in Sweden.

=== Dead Man (2006–2007) ===
Next, Dead Man decided to start on making their debut album. Dead Man snuck into the famous Svenska Grammofon Studion and began to work on their first album. In early 2006, with a fresh set of songs in hand, Dead Man was set to release their eponymous debut album. Released via Sweden’s Crusher Records, Dead Man was praised by Rock Hard, Metal Hammer and Stoner Rock.

=== Euphoria (2007–2009) ===
In mid-2007, Dead Man once again entered the studio to record their second album, Euphoria. While Dead Man was successful in the underground stoner and progressive rock scene, Euphoria would awaken many more listeners.

In February 2009, Dead Man embarked on its first U.S. tour. In April 2009, Dead Man played the Afterburner of the Roadburn Festival.

== Discography ==
- "Ship Ahoy!"/"Thousand Mile Stare" 7", (October 6, 2004) Crusher Records
- Dead Man CD/LP, (January 25 and February 25, 2006) Crusher Records
- Euphoria CD/LP, (March 31, 2008) Crusher Records / MeteorCity Records
- "Get off my back"/"Love on my brain" 7", (September 9, 2011)

== Band members ==
- Kristoffer Sjödahl - guitar, vocals
- Johan Fuxin - bass
- Jesper Mattsoff - drums

== Former band members ==
- Sebastian Gyllström - guitar
- Mikael Olausson - bass
- Peter Lindström - guitar
- Johan Rydholm - acoustic guitar, vocals
- Joakim Dimberg - bass, vocals
- Jonas Askerlund - drums
- Marcus Allard - drums
