= List of Case Closed volumes (21–40) =

Cover of Case Closed volume 36

The Case Closed manga, known in Japan as Detective Conan (名探偵コナン, Meitantei Conan), is written by Gosho Aoyama and serialized in Shogakukan's shōnen manga magazine Weekly Shōnen Sunday since January 19, 1994. Since Case Closed's premiere, over 1,000 chapters have been released in Japan, making it the 25th longest running manga series. Several adaptations based on Case Closed have been made, including an anime series and animated films. A database consisting of all the cases from the manga was launched in 2007. Viz Media announced its licensing of the series on June 1, 2004, and following Funimation Entertainment's English localization, released the series under the name Case Closed with renamed characters. The series follows high school detective Jimmy Kudo who was transformed into a child after being forced to swallow a poison.

The tankōbon volumes 21–40 contain chapters 201–413. Shogakukan released all twenty volumes between October 17, 1998, and February 18, 2003. Viz Media released the volumes between January 15, 2008, and October 11, 2011.

== Volumes ==
No.	Title	Original release date	English release date
21	Strangers on a Plane	October 17, 1998; 978-4-09-125491-7	January 15, 2008; 978-1-4215-1456-7
201. "Another Victim" (そしてまた..., Soshite Mata...); 202. "Countdown" (カウントダウン, Kauntodaun); 203. "The Ivory Tower" (象牙の塔, Sōge no Tō); 204. "The First Entry" (最初の挨拶, Saisho no Aisatsu); 205. "A Locked Room in the Sky" (大空の密室, Ōzora no Misshitsu); 206. "The Last Trump Card" (最後の切り札, Saigo no Kirifuda); 207. "A Secret Hidden in the Heart" (胸に秘めて..., Mune ni Himete...); 208. "The Sakuradamon Incident" (桜田門の変!?, Sakurada-mon no Hen!?); 209. "The Inspector's Deduction" (警部の推理, Keibu no Suiri); 210. "An Unforeseen Enemy" (意外な敵, Igai na Teki); 211. "A Perfect Day for Tokyo" (東京日和, Tōkyō Biyori)
When Conan, Dr. Agasa, and George go missing in the castle, Amy and Anita try to uncover its secret. On a plane ride, Rachel falls asleep and remembers Jimmy's first case which also took place aboard a plane. The Junior Detective League are given a tour of the police station by officers Wataru Takagi and Miwako Sato. They learn of a bank robbery, but when the bank president's wife is murdered, Conan joins Takagi and Sato on the case. Conan and Rachel join Harley and Kazuha for some shopping before the wedding of a family friend's kid. However, the butler is found dead in a closed room.
22	Murder on the Hokutosei Express	February 18, 1999; 978-4-09-125492-4	March 18, 2008; 978-1-4215-1674-5
212. "The Same" (おそろいや, Osoroiya); 213. "The Evidence" (証拠は..., Shōko wa...); 214. "The Trapped Quarry" (かかった獲物, Kakatta Emono); 215. "The Northern Star" (北斗星, Hokutosei); 216. "Give Yourself Away" (馬脚を露わす!?, Bakyaku o Arawasu!?); 217. To Be Continued"; 218. "The Terminal Station" (終着駅, Shūchakueki); 219. "Go, Serena" (それゆけ園子, Sore yuke Sonoko"; lit. Go, Sonoko!); 220. "Sleeping Beauty" (眠り姫, Nemuri Hime); 221. "The Prince of Kicks" (蹴撃の貴公子, Shūgeki no Kikōshi)
Conan and Harley work on the case of the dead butler in a closed room. While on a train, a killing and a recent robbery leads Conan to believe that both events are tied to a mystery novel that his father once wrote, but never published. On a beach trip, Serena is wooed by a good-looking guy but is attacked in multiple incidents by a mysterious man.
23	Film Threat	April 17, 1999; 978-4-09-125493-1	May 20, 2008; 978-1-4215-1675-2
222. "At the Movies" (チネ・チッタ, Chine Citta); 223. "The Truth Inside the Mirror" (鏡の中の真実, Kagami no Naka no Shinjitsu); 224. "A Place for Dreams" (夢の場所, Yume no Basho); 225. "The Phantom Schemer" (影の計画師, Kage no Keikakushi); 226. "Murder in Flames" (殺意は燃えて..., Satsui wa Moete...); 227. "An Unexpected Target" (意外な標的, Igai na Hyōteki); 228. "Vanished Into the Waves" (波涛に消ゆ..., Hatō ni Kiyu...); 229. "The Truth" (これが真実, Kore ga Shinjitsu); 230. "A Witness Returns" (証人生還, Shōnin Seikan); 231. "Begin Investigation!!" (捜査開始!!, Sōsa Kaishi!!)
The Junior Detectives spend an afternoon watching monster movies and learn that the theater will be closing; however, the buyer is murdered during a screening. Rachel, Richard and Conan attend a private cruise. They discover that it was arranged by someone related to a famous bank robbery 20 years ago. With a retired police colleague of Richard's and teen detective Harley Hartwell, they attempt to determine who is behind the cruise and the recent deaths of some of the passengers. Sato chases down a fleeing suspect but inadvertently handcuffs him and herself to a toilet.
24	Love and Death	July 17, 1999; 978-4-09-125494-8	July 15, 2008; 978-1-4215-1676-9
232. "On the Spot" (現場検証, Genba Kenshō); 233. "Countdown" (カウントダウン, Kauntodaun); 234. "Six More Months" (あと半年..., Ato Hantoshi...); 235. "In the Dark" (闇の中..., Yami no Naka...); 236. "An Unbelievable Connection" (信じられぬ接点, Shinjirarenu Setten); 237. "The Remains of the Heart" (最後の心, Saigo no Kokoro); 238. "The Street Corner of Betrayal" (裏切りの街角, Uragiri no Machikado); 239. "The Black Funeral" (漆黒の葬列, Shikkoku no Sōretsu); 240. "A Sudden Farewell" (突然の別れ, Totsuzen no Wakare); 241. "A Bullet from the Past" (過去からの銃弾, Kako kara no Jūdan); 242. "A World in White" (白の世界, Shiro no Sekai)
The Junior Detectives help Takagi investigate a murder suspect so that the original suspect, who is handcuffed to Sato in an art museum, can be freed to make it to his daughter's wedding. However, they soon learn that the art museum is going to be demolished that next morning. Richard's doctor recommends that Richard stop drinking, but when the doctor is found dead in his bathtub due to an electric shock, his family members and their hired maid become suspects. But during the case, Ran acts quite friendly towards the doctor's son Tomoaki Araide, that Jimmy feels jealous. Conan learns that the Black Organization is going to murder someone at a hotel, but that they are aware that Sherry will be there and look forward to killing her.
25	Along Came A Spider	October 18, 1999; 978-4-09-125495-5	September 16, 2008; 978-1-4215-1677-6
243. "Odd One Out?" (仲間外れ!?, Nakama Hazure!?); 244. "The Dead Don't Speak" (死者は語らず, Shisha wa Katarazu); 245. "Words from the Fingertip" (手探りの言葉, Tesaguri no Kotoba); 246. "The Spider House" (蜘蛛屋敷, Kumo Yashiki); 247. "The Sight of Fear" (恐怖を見た, Kyōfu o Mita); 248. "Harley's Shout" (平次の叫び, Heiji no Sakebi"; lit. Heiji's Shout); 249. "Harley's Anger" (平次の怒り, Heiji no Ikari"; lit. Heiji's Anger); 250. "Speechless" (言葉にできない, Kotoba ni Dekinai); 251. "The Wounded Detective League" (手負いの探偵団, Teoi no Tantei-dan); 252. "The Trusty Sleuths" (心強き名探偵達, Kokoro-zuyoki Meitantei-tachi); 253. "One Sure Thing" (一つの確信, Hitotsu no Kakushin)
Conan, Rachel and Serena are out skating when they encounter a group of friends that were in a clay shooting club together. But one of its members is murdered in a bathroom and the others become suspects. Harley and Richard are hired by a family who makes fancy puppets to investigate a curse of the Spider Queen where a string of people have mysteriously hung themselves amidst a web of strings in a shed. During the investigation, Serena is nearly killed. While Rachel prepares for a play in which a Black Knight will kiss her, Conan goes with the Junior Detectives on a camping trip where they find a cave and encounter some criminals hiding a body. Conan is shot in the process, and the other members must escape the cave before they are killed.
26	The Play's the Thing	February 18, 2000; 978-4-09-125496-2	November 18, 2008; 978-1-4215-1678-3
254. "A Hesitant Heart" (迷える心, Mayoeru Kokoro); 255. "A Sudden Intruder" (突然の侵入者, Totsuzen no Shin'nyūsha); 256. "Covering the Truth" (覆われた真実, Ōwareta Shinjitsu); 257. "A Daring Return" (命懸けの復活, Inochigake no Fukkatsu); 258. "A Quick Break" (束の間の休息, Tsuka no ma no Kyūsoku); 259. "A Moment of Peace" (穏やかな時間, Odayaka na Jikan); 260. "A Special Place" (思い出の場所, Omoide no Basho); 261. "Striking a Chord" (琴線に触れた!?, Kinsen ni Fureta!?); 262. "The Disappearing Sound" (消えた音, Kieta Oto); 263. "Waiting for Spring?" (春よ来い?, Haru yo Koi?)
Rachel gives her blood to save Conan. Suspecting that Rachel might be onto his real identity, Conan plans on revealing his identity to her until Anita tells him the consequences: reveal his identity and put Rachel and everyone else in danger, continue to act cold and ignorant, or a third choice. During the school play, a man is murdered. At first Harley appears as Jimmy in disguise, but he is easily found out. Then the real Jimmy Kudo (in full size thanks to an experimental antidote by Anita) returns and solves the murder mystery. Later, Jimmy takes Rachel to a fancy restaurant and is about to tell her something when someone is murdered in an elevator. Jimmy solves the case but reverts to his kid size before being able to return to Rachel. Richard is hired to investigate a music box given to a girl who had been pen pals with a stranger using a pager. They are able to track the sender of the pager to a family whose late grandfather was the correspondent. Rachel sees a mysterious silhouette crossing the hallway and one of the family members is injured in the head by a koto instrument. Conan solves the mystery and uncovers where the family treasure in the form of a rare postage stamp is hidden.
27	Game On	April 18, 2000; 978-4-09-125497-9	January 20, 2009; 978-1-4215-1679-0
264. "Payback" (身から出た錆, Mi kara Deta Sabi); 265. "Material Witness" (重要参考人, Jūyō Sankōnin); 266. "Unwavering Resolve" (思い切って..., Omoikitte...); 267. "The Man from 18 Years Ago" (18年前の男, Jū-hachi-nen Mae no Otoko); 268. "The Captive Detective" (囚われた刑事, Torawareta Keiji); 269. "Time's Up" (時効成立, Taimu Rimitto); 270. "Game On" (試合開始, Gēmu Sutāto); 271. TTX"; 272. "Game Over" (試合終了, Gēmu Ōbā); 273. "Three's a Crowd" (呉越同舟, Goetsu Dōshū)
Enjoying a day at the hotel resort, Richard is framed for the murder of his separated wife Eva Kaden's lawyer colleague, and must depend on Eva to solve it for him. Miwako Sato's father's murder case is about to expire from a statute of limitations, and Miwako has one last day to try to find the killer. At the same time, the Junior Detectives help Miwako and Takagi track down a serial arsonist. Rachel and Serena find their new English teacher, Jodie Saintmillion, playing games at the video arcade, but when a man is mysteriously killed while playing a virtual reality fighting game, Conan scrambles to find the culprit. The Junior Detectives forage for Matsutake mushrooms, but when George wanders into a zone that is fenced off for hunting, the others have to split up to find him. Anita and Mitch discover a bear cub and a human corpse, but are then shot at by a hunter.
28	The Mermaid Vanishes	July 18, 2000; 978-4-09-125498-6	March 17, 2009; 978-1-4215-2196-1
274. "The Small Target" (小さな標的, Chiisana Hyōteki); 275. "True Motive" (殺意の真意, Satsui no Shin'i); 276. "A Deceitful Woman" (偽りの人, Itsuwari no Hito); 277. "A Handful of Proof" (一握りの証拠, Hitonigiri no Shōko); 278. "A Fearsome Woman" (恐怖の女, Kyōfu no Onna); 279. "The Mermaid's Curse" (人魚の呪い?, Ningyo no Noroi?); 280. "Lady Mikoto's Prediction" (命様の予言, Mikoto-sama no Yogen); 281. "The Devil's Arrow" (悪魔の矢, Akuma no Ya); 282. "The Last Arrow" (最後の一矢, Saigo no Hito Ya); 283. "An Unrequited Heart" (報われぬ心, Mukuwarenu Kokoro); 284. "A Secret Enclosed" (閉ざされた秘密, Tozasareta Himitsu)
The case continues and the shooter is identified. A mysterious woman hires Richard to look for a guy based on a picture if them in junior high, but when they arrive the man is found dead. Conan finds inconsistencies in the woman's story as well. When they solve the case, the woman is revealed to be Heiji's mother. Heiji and Haruka join Richard's case where a girl has gone missing at Fukui Island, also known as Mermaid Island. There is a tradition where an elder would bestow long life in the form of arrows connected to the legendary mermaid, however the girl's peers are also mysteriously killed. A woman walks out of a payphone and is beaten to death by a man with a bat. When Inspector Megure hears a comment of how useless the police are, he starts getting flashbacks.
29	What Ms. Jodie Saw	September 18, 2000; 978-4-09-125499-3	May 19, 2009; 978-1-4215-2197-8
285. "Something Strange" (小さな違和感, Chiisana Iwakan); 286. "An Unexpected Motive" (意外な理由, Igai na Riyū); 287. "An Unseen Fear" (見えない恐怖, Mienai Kyōfu); 288. "Red Alert" (危険信号, Kiken Shingō); 289. "In Plain Sight" (白日の下の潜伏, Hakujitsu no Moto no Senpuku); 290. "Dog Lovers" (愛犬家たち, Aikenka-tachi); 291. "Slight Traces" (わずかな足跡, Wazuka na Ashiato); 292. "Indelible Proof" (消えなかった証拠, Kienakatta Shōko); 293. "K3" (Kスリー, Kē Surī); 294. "Whatever Remains" (最後の可能性, Saigo no Kanōsei); 295. "Red Card" (レッドカード, Reddo Kādo)
The case regarding the dead ganguro girls continues as Conan discovers the suspect is going after girls with platform shoes, including Serena, and Inspector Megure's past is revealed. When a bus is hijacked, Conan suspects one of the passengers to be part of the gang given that his attempts to gather evidence are caught by the hijackers. However, Anita senses a member of the Black Organization is aboard, and it is revealed that the hijackers intend to blow up the bus. During an estate giveaway among dog-lovers, a dog is kidnapped, and Conan suspects the culprit is one of the regular visitors. Conan gets to meet his soccer idol at an event for a restaurant opening by some sports celebrities, but an infamous tabloid writer is murdered during a lighting of a bunch of rooms on a neighboring hotel, and the celebrities become suspects.
30	The Kaido Game	December 18, 2000; 978-4-09-125500-6	July 21, 2009; 978-1-4215-2198-5
296. "The Direct Approach" (直球勝負, Chokkyū Shōbu); 297. "The Open Locked Room" (開かれた密室, Hirakareta Misshitsu); 298. "Time Difference" (時間差の罠, Jikansa no Wana); 299. "Condemnation" (糾合, Kyūgō); 300. "Tragedy" (惨劇, Torajidi); 301. "Murder" (密殺, Missatsu); 302. "Sting" (誑欺, Sutingu); 303. "George's Misfortune" (元太の災難, Genta no Sainan"; lit. Genta's Misfortune); 304. "George's Trap" (元太の罠, Genta no Wana"; lit. Genta's Trap); 305. "There" (そこには..., Soko ni wa...); 306. "Encircled by Proof" (手がかり包囲網, Tegakari Hōimō)
The day following the sports celebrity case, Rachel, Richard and Conan take a train when they meet Takagi and Sato who are escorting a drug suspect. However, when a bomb threat is reported in a bathroom, the drug suspect is soon found dead in another bathroom, in an apparent suicide. Richard, Rachel and Conan are invited to a mansion along with many famous detectives by the Kaito Kid. They must solve the mystery of the manor before they are all killed off or kill each other. When George acts differently at school, the Junior Detectives learn he is being targeted by a killer because he had witnessed someone who was wanted for snatching bags. George retraces his steps in trying to remember where he had seen the snatcher. Rachel and Serena take a pottery class, but a murder occurs at the shop. Conan knows who the murderer is but has to find evidence to prove it to the police.
31	Too Many Moores	March 17, 2001; 978-4-09-126161-8	September 15, 2009; 978-1-4215-2199-2
307. "The Hidden Word" (隠れた言葉, Kakureta Kotoba); 308. "The Impersonator Appears" (偽物登場, Nisemono Tōjō); 309. "The Truth Revealed" (偽物の真実, Nisemono no Shinjitsu); 310. "A Time of Deceit" (偽りの時, Itsuwari no Toki); 311. "The Warm Sea" (暖かき海, Atatakaki Umi); 312. "Caught in the Net" (網にかかるは..., Ami ni Kakaru wa...); 313. "A Courageous Choice" (勇気ある決断, Yūki Aru Ketsudan); 314. "The Swordsman from Osaka" (浪花の剣士, Naniwa no Kenshi); 315. "The Restless Swordsman" (移ろいの剣士, Utsuroi no Kenshi); 316. "Swordsman of Justice" (裁きの剣士, Sabaki no Kenshi); 317. "The Conqueror's Castle" (天下人の城, Tenkabi no Shiro)
Conan solves the pottery murder. A man pretends to be Richard Moore in order to have an inn manager give him a case with clues to a treasure, but the impersonator dies and the inn's workers become suspects. At a beach resort, a fisherman does not show for a party, and is found dead in the ocean. His peers are suspects. Harley's school is participating in a kendo tournament, but when a person on another team is murdered and mysteriously relocated from a gym equipment room to the showers, Heiji tries to solve the case before Conan can arrive. In Osaka, a murder takes place among a group of tourists who are role-playing historical characters. One of the victims falls from a rooftop in flames.
32	You're History	April 18, 2001; 978-4-09-126162-5	November 17, 2009; 978-1-4215-2884-7
318. "The Conqueror's Treasure" (天下人の宝, Tenkabi no Takara); 319. "Out of the Past" (時を越えて..., Toki o Koete...); 320. "Osaka Kabuki" (浪花勧進帳, Naniwa Kanjin-chō); 321. "The Sorrow of the Tiger Scroll" (悲しみの虎の巻, Kanashimi no Tora no Maki); 322. "Reunion" (久しぶりの集結, Hisashiburi no Shūketsu); 323. "The Secret of the Idols" (アイドル達の秘密, Aidoru-tachi no Himitsu); 324. "The Idols' Misunderstanding" (アイドル達の誤解, Aidoru-tachi no Gokai); 325. "What the Lion Dropped" (ライオンの落とし物, Raion no Otoshimono); 326. "P&A"; 327. "A Crazy Plan" (バカな作戦, Baka na Sakusen); 328. "The Marriage Meeting" (佐藤のお見合い, Satō no Omiai)
Another of the role-playing tourists dies, Heiji tries to solve the Osaka case, but gets interference from his father. Yoko Okino reunites with her former girl group colleagues to celebrate member Kaoru's engagement, but when Kaoru is mysteriously attacked in the bath, the girls and nearby guys become suspects. A man who goes by the name James Black is mistaken for an owner of a private collection of exotic animals used in animal shows and is abducted. The Junior Detectives trace his whereabouts but must chase them before the signal as well as Black dies out. Pressured by her mother, Sato randomly picks a guy for her omiai (marriage meeting), but he turns out to be her colleague Santos. While Takagi is in the midst of solving a robbery case, Sato and Santos make a wager to get married if Takagi doesn't stop them.
33	Valentine's Day Massacre	July 18, 2001; 978-4-09-126163-2	January 19, 2010; 978-1-4215-2884-7
329. "Sato's Odds" (佐藤の勝算, Satō no Shōsan); 330. "Sato's Feelings" (佐藤の気持ち, Satō no Kimochi); 331. "Bloody Valentine (1)" (血のバレンタイン①, Buraddi Barentain Ichi); 332. "Bloody Valentine (2)" (血のバレンタイン②, Buraddi Barentain Ni); 333. "Bloody Valentine (3)" (血のバレンタイン③, Buraddi Barentain San); 334. "Bloody Valentine (4)" (血のバレンタイン④, Buraddi Barentain Yon); 335. "The Wife's Memento" (妻の忘れ形見, Tsuma no Wasuregatami); 336. "A Pure Scent" (清潔な香り, Seiketsu na Kaori); 337. "The Life of a Flower" (花の命..., Hana no Inochi...); 338. "X Marks the Spot" (「×」のその意味, Ekkusu no Sono Imi); 339. OXΔ□?"
Conan helps Wataru Takagi solve the mystery of the robber with seemingly contradictory descriptions, but he must do it before time runs out and Sato marries Santos. For Valentine's Day, Richard takes Rachel, Serena, and Conan to a house on the snowy mountains where the two girls can make chocolates for their loved ones. However, while there, a man is murdered in the winter storm and a legendary snow lady is blamed. Later a murder occurs in a man's home when he hires the Junior Detectives to search his house for a watch. Rachel and Conan try to figure out what "X" means, but Serena and Jodie won't give them hints. A man is murdered at the mall; his dying message is on a letter with the symbols O X Δ.
34	The Unusual Suspects	September 18, 2001; 978-4-09-126164-9	April 13, 2010; 978-1-4215-2885-4
340. "Time to Pick the Apple" (リンゴの狩り時, Ringo no Karidoki); 341. "Striking Back" (反撃の糸口..., Hangeki no Itoguchi...); 342. "The Flying Neighbor" (飛んだ隣人, Tonda Rinjin); 343. "Who Are Ya?" (あんた何者や, Anta Nanimon'ya); 344. "Booing Up a Storm" (嵐のブーイング, Arashi no Būingu); 345. "The Suspicious Fan" (疑惑のサポーター, Giwaku no Sapōtā); 346. "The Fake Fan" (エセサポーター, Ese Sapōtā); 347. "Déjà Vu in the Rain" (雨のデジャビュ, Ame no Dejabū); 348. "The Treacherous Towel" (おしぼりの罠, Oshibori no Wana); 349. "Memory Refreshed" (晴れた記憶, Hareta Kioku); 350. "Golden Apple (1)" (ゴールデンアップル①, Gōruden Appuru Ichi)
Conan gives hints to Megure so he is able to decode the mysterious symbols to nab the culprit. An unknown person steals the police's investigation records relating to Richard Moore, and Conan is worried it could be the Black Organization. With Harley's persistence, he investigates Jodie to see if she really is Chris Vineyard, daughter of American actress Sharon Vineyard. They visit Jodie's apartment complex, but when their neighbor jumps off a building, they suspect a murder. After a soccer game, a blogger reputed to be a hooligan is killed in a crowded train. The police find three suspects who were at the game, but Conan suspects one of them is lying. At a restaurant, Rachel is courted to star in a film. The group is invited to share dinner but one of the men is poisoned and Richard is suspected of doing the deed. As Conan uses Richard to solve the case, Ran feels really sick from fever, and faints in the restaurant. She has a flash back of the case involving Jimmy, Jimmy's mother, Sharon Vineyard and herself when they were in New York City.
35	Greek Tragedy	December 18, 2001; 978-4-09-126165-6	July 13, 2010; 978-1-4215-2886-1
351. "Golden Apple (2)" (ゴールデンアップル②, Gōruden Appuru Ni); 352. "Golden Apple (3)" (ゴールデンアップル③, Gōruden Appuru San); 353. "Golden Apple (4)" (ゴールデンアップル④, Gōruden Appuru Yon); 354. "Golden Apple (5)" (ゴールデンアップル⑤, Gōruden Appuru Go); 355. "The Mystery of the Haunted House (1)" (幽霊屋敷の謎①, Yūrei Yashiki no Nazo Ichi); 356. "The Mystery of the Haunted House (2)" (幽霊屋敷の謎②, Yūrei Yashiki no Nazo Ni); 357. "The Mystery of the Haunted House (3)" (幽霊屋敷の謎③, Yūrei Yashiki no Nazo San); 358. "Missing Mitch (1)" (消えた光彦①, Kieta Mitsuhiko Ichi"; lit. Missing Mitsuhiko (1)); 359. "Missing Mitch (2)" (消えた光彦②, Kieta Mitsuhiko Ni"; lit. Missing Mitsuhiko (2)); 360. "Missing Mitch (3)" (消えた光彦③, Kieta Mitsuhiko San"; lit. Missing Mitsuhiko (3)); 361. "Death Island" (デス・アイランド, Desu airando)
In the New York City case, Rachel recalls how Jimmy's mother and Sharon were meeting up with their actress colleagues. During the stage performance, the lead actor is killed by someone in the balcony, but Jimmy determines it was by one of the actor's colleagues. Rachel then recalls meeting the man wearing the knit cap that she would later see in other cases, and that he was an FBI agent. Back to the present, Rachel checks in with Dr. Araide. One of Araide's patients tells Richard about a haunted apartment. He, Rachel and Conan investigate and find that indeed there are ghost-like incidents: a ghost appears on the television screen, red water appears in a toilet, and a ghost's face forms outside a window. Later on, Mitch skips school without telling anyone and is in a forest for reasons unknown. The Junior Detectives try to find him, but discover there is also a serial killer who escaped into the forest. Richard and Harley are invited to a beach town and island where they are to solve a case involving dead bodies with inscriptions beside them.
36	With a Bang	February 18, 2002; 978-4-09-126166-3	October 12, 2010; 978-1-4215-2887-8
362. "A Dangerous Visitor" (危険な来訪者, Kiken na Raihōsha); 363. "Mystery Word" (ミステリー・ワード, Misuterī Wādo); 364. "The Emissary of Guso" (グソーの使い, Gusō no Tsukai); 365. "The Princess and the Dragon Palace" (姫と龍宮城, Hime to Ryū Gūjō); 366. "Evil at the Parade" (悪意の中の行進, Akui no Naka no Parēdo); 367. "Video Evidence" (ビデオの中の証拠, Bideo no Naka no Shōko); 368. "The Bomber's Aim" (爆弾犯の狙い, Bakudan-han no Nerai); 369. "The Detective Who Didn't Return" (帰らざる刑事, Kaerazaru Keiji); 370. "An Unerasable Memory" (消せない記憶, Kesenai Kioku); 371. "The Red Trap" (赤い罠, Akai Wana); 372. "The Most Important Thing in the World" (この世で一番..., Kono yo de Ichiban...)
The case of the dead bodies with inscriptions next to them continues. One of the visiting girls who scuba dives is killed as well as the ship's captain, leaving the gang stranded on an island. A threatening letter is sent to the police about an event that will happen during a Tokyo parade. It relates to a bombing crime in the past. Takaki disguised as Matsuda and the bombings causes Sato to suffer flashbacks. After reviewing video footage from Mitch and noticing something peculiar, they arrest a robber, but it turns out to be only coincidental and that the bomber is still on the loose. A riddled letter is found near one of the bombings, revealing the location of a bomb big enough to destroy a tower. Conan and Takagi find the bomb, but realize that another bomb lies in the wait, and that during the last three seconds to detonation, a hint will reveal the bomb's location. If they wait for the hint, Conan and Takagi will die in the explosion and if they dismantle it, more people will die.
37	A Study in Black	April 18, 2002; 978-4-09-126167-0	January 11, 2011; 978-1-4215-2888-5
373. "Bye-Bye" (バイバイ..., Bai bai...); 374. "Richard's Choice (1)" (小五郎の選択①, Kogorō no Sentaku Ichi"; lit. Kogoro's Choice (1)); 375. "Richard's Choice (2)" (小五郎の選択②, Kogorō no Sentaku Ni"; lit. Kogoro's Choice (2)); 376. "Richard's Choice (3)" (小五郎の選択③, Kogorō no Sentaku San"; lit. Kogoro's Choice (3)); 377. "The Footsteps of Darkness (1)" (暗黒の足跡①, Ankoku no Ashiato Ichi); 378. "The Footsteps of Darkness (2)" (暗黒の足跡②, Ankoku no Ashiato Ni); 379. "The Footsteps of Darkness (3)" (暗黒の足跡③, Ankoku no Ashiato San); 380. "White Snow, Black Shadow" (白い雪...黒い影..., Shiroi Yuki... Kuroi Kage...); 381. "A Dangerous Meeting" (危険なめぐり逢い, Kiken na Meguri Ai); 382. "Along for the Ride" (同乗者, Dōjōsha)
Conan defuses the elevator bomb, but they must find the next location before those bombs are detonated. Richard makes a guest appearance for an episode in a detective show, and meets a childhood classmate who has become a pretty actress and who also knows about Richard and Eva's relationship when they were in school. However, one of the actors is killed, and Conan, who has used his only sleeping dart earlier, must rely on Richard to actually solve the case. Richard is asked to track down the whereabouts of a renowned game designer Itakura who had given a challenge to three of his developers to develop chess, shogi, and go computer games, but remains elusive from the press. When Itakura is found dead in a staged heart attack, the developers become suspects, but Conan discovers Itakura has also been working to develop some software for Vodka of the Black Organization. After solving the Itakura case, Conan manages to take the data disk of the man's diary and arranges a meeting with Vodka to drop off the software at a locker. On the way there, the car breaks down but they manage to get a ride with two suspicious people.
38	On the Ropes	July 18, 2002; 978-4-09-126168-7	April 12, 2011; 978-1-4215-2889-2
383. "A New Weapon!" (新兵器!, Shin Heiki!); 384. "A Surprising Treasure" (意外なお宝, Igai na Otakara); 385. "Amy's Concern" (歩美の心配, Ayumi no Shinpai"; lit. Ayumi's Concern); 386. "The Sunset and the Stairs" (夕陽と階段, Yūhi to Kaidan); 387. "Tarnished Hero" (汚れたヒーロー, Yogoreta Hīrō); 388. "The Shadows of the Wolves" (狼たちの影, Ōkami-tachi no Kage); 389. "The Man Who Couldn't Be a Wolf" (狼になれなかった男, Ōkami ni Narenakatta Otoko); 390. "Harley's Struggle (1)" (服部平次絶体絶命!①, Hattori Heiji Zettai Zetsumei! Ichi"; lit. Heiji Hattori's Despair! (1)); 391. "Harley's Struggle (2)" (服部平次絶体絶命!②, Hattori Heiji Zettai Zetsumei! Ni"; lit. Heiji Hattori's Despair! (2)); 392. "Harley's Struggle (3)" (服部平次絶体絶命!③, Hattori Heiji Zettai Zetsumei! San"; lit. Heiji Hattori's Despair! (3))
Conan stops the two robbers. He plants the data disk in the locker with various devices to try and track down the black organization, but was thwarted due to Gin. A friend of Amy's neighbor offers to give Amy their Girls Day doll set, but while they are there, a valuable wall scroll is stolen. Richard is invited to attend a pro wrestling event where a popular wrestler Wolf Face is putting his lucha libre mask on the line. However, his opponent is killed just before the match by someone dressed as Wolf Face. Harley and Kazuha are kidnapped and are forced to solve a code or be killed. Their only hope is for Conan to figure out Harley's clues.
39	The Adventure of the Scarlet Blaze	November 18, 2002; 978-4-09-126169-4	July 12, 2011; 978-1-4215-3499-2
393. "The Lure of the Red Horse" (誘う赤馬, Izanau Aka Uma); 394. "The Shadow of the Red Horse" (赤馬の影, Aka Uma no Kage); 395. "The Rider of the Red Horse" (赤馬の持ち主, Aka Uma no Mochinushi); 396. "The Witness of the Red Horse" (赤馬の目撃者, Aka Uma no Mokugekisha); 397. "Three of a Kind" (愚かなる模倣, Oroka Naru Mohō); 398. "A Friendship Torn Apart (1)" (引き裂かれた友情①, Hikisakareta Yūjō Ichi); 399. "A Friendship Torn Apart (2)" (引き裂かれた友情②, Hikisakareta Yūjō Ni); 400. "A Friendship Torn Apart (3)" (引き裂かれた友情③, Hikisakareta Yūjō San); 401. "A Little Client" (小さな依頼者, Chiisana Iraisha); 402. "A Woman with a Mole" (ホクロのある女性, Hokuro no Aru Josei); 403. "The Red Mole" (赤いホクロ...!?, Akai Hokuro...!?)
An arsonist has been hitting houses in Tokyo and leaving a calling card of a red horse figurine at the scene. At first, the shop owner who sells the figurines is suspected as he has been sleepwalking, and he even confesses to the crime, but Conan and Harley uncover motives from multiple people connected to him and a victim from one of the fires. When Agasa and the Junior Detectives go camping, they meet a group of college students who are using a motorhome. One of the students who biked ahead to an overlook is found dead on the road. Next, a child actor hires Richard to find his mother who had abandoned him as a baby but had sent him fan mail postcards regularly. They trace the postcards to an inn with a hot springs, but a freelance writer also looking for the mother is killed. The writer's cell phone picture shows the killer with a mole on her breast.
40	A Kiss Before Sleuthing	February 18, 2003; 978-4-09-126170-0	October 11, 2011; 978-1-4215-3500-5
404. "Save the Date!" (甘いデートにご注意を!, Amai Dēto ni Gochūi o!); 405. "A Misguided Manhunt" (不純な大捜索, Fujan na Dai Sōsaku); 406. "An Accidental Arrest" (不純な大捕り物, Fujan na Ōtorimono); 407. "Tennis Court Memories" (思い出のテニスコート, Omoide no Tenisu Kōto); 408. "The Suspicious Curry" (疑惑のカレー, Giwaku no Carē); 409. "Speechless" (声が出ない...!?, Koe ga Denai...!?); 410. "Doc Agasa's First Love" (博士の初恋, Hakase no Hatsukoi"; lit. Doctor's First Love); 411. "That Memorable Place" (思い出の場所, Omoide no Basho); 412. "First Love・Reunion・Farewell" (初恋・再会・別れ, Hatsukoi, Saikai, Wakare); 413. "Richard's Blunder" (小五郎大失態, Kogorō Dai Shittai"; lit. Kogoro's Great Blunder)
The police department stakes out Takagi and Sato who are on a date at the amusement park. Takagi plans to give Sato an engagement ring but his backpack gets mixed up with a drug dealer's. Serena and Rachel go to a tennis court near Serena's summer home, but it's rainy, and a storm washes Richard's rental car. A tennis instructor guy invites them to stay over but when the guy's father dies in an apparent suicide, Conan suspects foul play. However, because he has caught a cold, Conan loses his voice. Later, the Junior Detectives help Agasa locate his first love based on a letter with a mysterious set of numbers, as his previous attempts to meet her the previous three decades has failed. Richard accepts a case where a woman wants him to find out who is planning to murder her husband, but when Richard gets into serious debt having spent the potential reward money, Eva and Rachel take on the case. Conan accompanies them to the client, who is a young woman, but they receive a visit from Jimmy's mother.
