= Dead Man (album) =

Dead man

Studio album by Dead Man
- Released: January 25, 2006 on CD; February 25, 2006 on LP
- Recorded: June 2005 at Svenska Grammofon Studion, Gothenburg, Sweden
- Genre: Psychedelic rock, folk rock
- Length: 42:29
- Label: Crusher Records
- Producer: Christopher God, John Rönneklev & Dead Man

Dead Man chronology
Dead man (2006)	Euphoria (2008)

Dead Man is the debut studio album by Swedish psychedelic rock band Dead Man, released on January 25 on CD and February 25, 2006 on LP by Crusher Records.

== Track listing ==
1. "Goin' Over the Hill" – 4:50
2. "Haunted Man" – 5:20
3. "Mumbo Gumbo" – 3:01
4. "Season of the Dead" – 5:03
5. "Further" – 6:18
6. "Highway" – 3:53
7. "Deep Forest Green " – 14:02

== Personnel ==
Dead Man

- Guitar, Percussion, Vocals - Johan Rydholm
- Guitar, Percussion, Vocals - Kristoffer Sjödahl
- Bass, Synthesizer [Moog], Xylophone, Piano, Vocals - Joakim Dimberg
- Drums, Percussion, Vocals - Marcus Allard

Additional Personnel

- Engineer - Christopher God, John Rönneklev
- Harmonica - Peter Carlsson (track: 3)
- Mastered By - Henryk Lipp
- Producer - Christopher God, Dead Man, John Rönneklev
- Artwork By - Fredrik Fogelqvist
