= The Surfin' Lungs =

English surf music band

- Origin: Bracknell, Berkshire, England
- Genres: Surf, punk rock, pop
- Years active: 1981–present
- Labels: Big Beat, Beat International, Lux-Noise, No Tomorrow, Wild Punk Records
- Members: Chris Pearce; Clive Gilling; Ray Webb; John Bowles
- Past members: Geoffo Knipe; Lee Money; Al Beckett; Graeme Block; Sputnik Weazel; Steve Dean
- Website: surfinlungs.co.uk

The Surfin' Lungs are an English surf music band originally from Bracknell, Berkshire, who were formed in 1981 by Chris Pearce and Geoffo Knipe. The original line-up consisted of: Chris Pearce (lead vocals, guitar), Geoffo Knipe (guitar, keyboards), Steve Dean (vocals, bass) and Lee Money (drums).

Their music has been influenced by groups such as The Beach Boys, The Monkees, The Ramones, Blondie, as well as Dick Dale, while The Barracudas and Dolly Mixture were among their contemporaries when they started out. Their musical style blended 1960s surf, pop and garage with the then new wave energy, while most of their recent musical output has had a surf and summer theme to it, and the vast majority of their songs are self-penned, with "Mickey's Car" being their first release in 1983 on their own Lover's Leap label.

The band have released a total of nine studio albums; Cowabunga (1985), The Biggest Wave (1987), The Beach Will Never Die (1990), Hang Loose with The Surfin' Lungs (1996), Goin' To Rockingham (2000), Surf, Drags & Rock'n'Roll (2005), and Full Petal Jacket (2010), Surf Factor 8 (2016) and Last Wave To Surfsville (2023), plus two compilation albums, as well as five EPs, and four singles: "Mickey's Car" (1983), "Pray For Sun" (1985), "Spirit Of Australia" (1990) and "Beach Bound" (1996).

== Band members ==
Original line-up from 1981

- Chris Pearce – lead vocals, guitar
- Geoffo Knipe – guitar, farfisa organ
- Steve Dean – vocals, bass
- Lee Money – drums

Current line-up

- Chris Pearce – lead vocals, guitar
- Clive Gilling – guitar, keyboards, vocals (replaced Geoffo Knipe, 1981-1987)
- Ray Webb – drums, vocals (replaced Sputnik Weazel, 2002-2010)
- John Bowles – bass, vocals (replaced Steve Dean, 1981-2022)

Other members involved with the band

- Al Beckett – drums, vocals (replaced Lee Money, 1982–1988)
- Graeme Block – drums (replaced Al Beckett, 1988–1990)
- Sputnik Weazel – drums, percussion, vocals (replaced Ray Webb, 1990-2002)
- Steve Dean – bass, vocals

== History ==
=== 1981–1990 ===
Chris Pearce formed the band with friend Geoffo Knipe in Bracknell in 1981, recruiting Steve Dean and Lee Money. That line-up only played one gig, at a street party in Bracknell to celebrate the wedding of Prince Charles and Lady Diana Spencer. Early the following year, drummer Money (also an amateur boxer) left to concentrate on his painting and decorating business, and he was replaced by Al Beckett, who was the drummer in Chris' previous band "The Items".

The new line-up started gigging in September 1982 and the band built up a reputation and following in the Thames Valley area circuit. Then in November 1983, they released their first single, "Mickey's Car/Yesterday's Summer", on their own Lover's Leap label, and national distribution followed. The single received rave reviews in the cult magazine ZigZag and became a record of the week on Radio 210. Regular gigs followed at Soho's Alice in Wonderland club and at the Hammersmith Clarendon, which earned the group decent live reviews in Sounds, Melody Maker and NME magazines.

A second single was released in 1985, with "Pray For Sun/Surfin' Chinese" again on their own Lover's Leap label, but this time with Robin Wills of The Barracudas on production duties. Later that year, the Lungs released their first "mini-album", Cowabunga, under the watchful eye of Wills again, but this time on Ace Records' Big Beat label, with the nine-track album receiving some respectable reviews in the music press.

March 1986 saw the release of the Big Beat EP, Surf-Jet Girl, which became a radio hit in Switzerland. At the controls this time was Roman Jugg of The Damned. Big Beat had big plans for the record and were planning to give away a surf-jet in a national competition to promote the EP, but the idea never got off the ground.

Around this time, legendary surf and hot rod music pioneer Gary Usher approached the band with a view to producing them, but nothing ever materialised.

The Lungs were then invited to the 25th anniversary of surf music in Switzerland. National radio station DRS-3 were celebrating the event with a gala show and he band customised some of their songs into DRS-3 jingles, which were played regularly over the next couple of years. "That brought us a lot of attention and they started to play our records more in Switzerland and we started to get a lot of gigs over there," said Chris. In conjunction with the anniversary, the band recorded "New Girl in School" to be included on a Jan & Dean tribute EP.

In 1987, the band split from the Big Beat label and Satellite Records expressed an interest in the group and their new label, Beat International, took up the option to release the band's second album The Biggest Wave in September. Similar in style to Cowabunga, The Biggest Wave featured a collection of surf/summer-inspired tunes with all 12 songs self-penned by the group. The album was self-produced by the group, and following a failure by Beat International to promote the album it received little attention. The Lungs followed this up with another tour to Switzerland, with DRS-3 broadcasting their concert in Basel live on air.

1987 also proved to be a pivotal year in the group's history as one of the founding members Geoffo Knipe left the band and was replaced by long-time friend Clive Gilling, who had been a member of Warp Factor Five.

In May 1988, the band were the main attraction of the Positive Mond music festival in Bern, Switzerland, and two further tours followed, plus the release of a compilation cd, Let 'Em Eat Surf. The Lungs also appeared on the Swiss TV music show Barock where they performed "Let 'Em Eat Surf". Later that year the band went through another line-up change when drummer Al Beckett left to be replaced by Graeme Block – who used to be in Steve Dean's brother's band What The Curtains – and the Lungs became regular features on the European touring circuit.

They changed record labels again and released their third album The Beach Will Never Die in 1990 on the Swiss label Lux-Noise. A 14-date tour of Germany and Austria followed to promote its release. "Every night was totally different," admitted Chris, "one night we played in a converted prison. We stayed there overnight and in the morning we could see prisoners walking in the yard."

Graeme Block left shortly after the release of that album to head to Los Angeles, with Ray Webb taking over the drumming stool. He is actually pictured on the album cover (taken at Studland Bay in Dorset) of The Beach Will Never Die, but never appeared on the album as at the time he was just filling in for Block who by then had left. Webb was later re-christened Ray Banz by the group.

The group also released a single off the album, "Spirit of Australia" which was coupled with "Worst Surfer on the Beach", which featured a rare lead vocal from Steve Dean.

=== (1991–2000) ===
This new line-up were scheduled to release a Christmas EP in 1992 to coincide with another tour to Switzerland, but unfortunately for the band the tour was cancelled and the EP was scrapped. However, they did get to play a couple of the songs "Surfin' On Christmas Day" and "Santa's Got a Brand New Board" as guests at the Frat Shacks London Christmas show.

The Surfin' Lungs then went back to the rehearsal studios and came up with their next album in 1996, Hang Loose with The Surfin' Lungs, released on the Spanish label, No Tomorrow, while a single from the album was released in Spain, "Beach Bound/Camaro Custom" to favourable reviews in the country. This was their first longplayer to feature drummer Ray Webb, re-christened Ray Banz by the group, who replaced Graeme Block. Of the 14 tracks, 13 were written by the group, while one, "Peppermint Twist", was a Joey Dee and the Starliters cover, which was a no.1 hit single on the U.S. Billboard Hot 100 in 1961. A different mix of "I Don't Wanna Ride That Rollercoaster" appeared on a free CD that came with an edition of surf music fanzine California Music.

In November 1997, the Lungs toured Spain and during their time over there released an EP Tell 'Em I'm Surfin in conjunction with Spanish group Shock Treatment. The Surfin' Lungs sang, while Shock Treatment provided the instrumentation. The tracks were The Fantastic Baggies' "Tell 'Em I'm Surfin", "New York's a Lonely Town" by The Tradewinds, "I Wanna Be Your Boyfriend" by The Rubinoos and an Elvis Presley number "His Latest Flame". Each member of the band took a lead vocal.

No Tomorrow then released a best of album, entitled Splashback and three years later in 2000, the Lungs recorded another EP, The Godfather, featuring a cover of the infamous theme of the film. The other three tracks were "Our Favourite Record Store", "One Crazy Summer" and a cover of The Beach Boys' "Drive In".

=== (2001–present) ===
In 2002, the band released their fifth album Goin' To Rockingham on the Spanish label No Tomorrow. At 17 tracks, this was their most ambitious record to date, most of which was recorded at No Machine Studios in Wokingham. Included on this album was The Godfather theme, while the Jan and Dean song "Surfin' Hearse" was also covered, as was "In The Sun" by Blondie. Rockingham also featured the first lead vocal from Clive Gilling, "Go Mr Gasser (Go! Go! Go!)".

This album, though, proved to be Ray Webb's last with the band as later that year he quit the group after 12 years, to be replaced in August by Sputnik Weazel, a singer-songwriter in his own right and who had been drumming in a band called X-ocettes.

In the spring of 2003, the band recorded the live EP Boss Beach Party, the first recordings to include Sputnik on drums.

2004 proved to be a good year for the Lungs as they saw two of their songs, "Surfin' to Forget About You" and"Go Little Surfer" appear on compilation CDs, while they went into the studio to record another EP, Holy Guacamole, the final collaboration with No Tomorrow. They also played the Felipop Festival in Spain, along with cult '60s psychpop group Nirvana.

A year later saw their sixth original album hit the streets, with Surf, Drags & Rock'n'Roll being released on new label, the Granada-based Wild Punk Records, with all 13 tracks penned by the band.

The next few years consisted of tours to Spain, where they appeared on national TV, along with regular performances at The Freebutt and The Prince Albert in Brighton, and The Windmill in Brixton.

Full Petal Jacket, the Surfin' Lungs' seventh original album was released in 2010, with all 14 songs written by the group. The band went on a 10-date tour of Spain to promote the record, their biggest tour since 1991 and while in Spain, "Full Petal Jacket" was the record of the week on El Sotano on National Radio 3 and it also reached number one in the Boss 20 chart of "Whole Lotta Shakin" on WITR-FM in Rochester, New York, while it also climbed to number three on the station's charts for 2010.

A single was planned later that year, a cover of Los Brincos' (a 1960s Spanish band) Mejor (translated as The Best) coupled with the old Brian Hyland hit Sealed with a Kiss, which was shelved, while they were also one of the main acts in the Surfer Joe Summer Festival in Livorno, Italy, which was part of an eight-date tour of the country.

A couple of years after the release of Full Petal Jacket, former drummer Ray Webb returned to the fold after filling in part-time, replacing Sputnik Weazel and in May 2013 the Lungs played the famous Cavern Club as one of many bands invited to the International Pop Overthrow event in Liverpool.

After a six-year hiatus, the Lungs released their eighth original album in July 2016, Surf Factor 8, released on Redondo Records, with Webb back on drums, his first album since "Goin To Rockingham" in 2002. Of the 14 tracks, 13 were self penned by the group, while there was a cover of The Ramones track Babysitter.

In 2023, the Lungs went back into the studio and produced their ninth album, Last Wave To Surfsville, which saw the band reduced to a trio following the departure of co-founder Dean. The album came out on Redondo Records in July, with 14 tracks, including a cover of the theme tune from Z-Cars. There was a first lead vocal on an album by drummer Webb, with Gilling also taking the lead on his song San Diego Dreaming.

John Bowles was brought into the band in late 2024 to replace original bassist Dean, whose departure from the band was made permanent after he decided to call it quits. After a temporary hiatus from performing live and following a few months of rehearsals, the Surfin’ Lungs were able to go back on the road again as a quartet.

== Discography ==
=== Albums ===
- Cowabunga (Big Beat, 1985)
- The Biggest Wave (Beat International, 1987)
- Let 'Em Eat Surf (Anthology) (Surfin' Again, 1988)
- The Beach Will Never Die (Lux-Noise, 1990)
- Hang Loose with The Surfin' Lungs (No Tomorrow, 1996)
- Splashback (Best of compilation) (No Tomorrow, 1997)
- Goin' To Rockingham (No Tomorrow, 2002)
- Surf, Drags & Rock'n'Roll (Wild Punk Records, 2005)
- Tales From The Beach, Vol. 1 (Wizzard in Vinyl, Japan only release, 2005)
- Full Petal Jacket (Wild Punk Records, 2010)
- Surf Factor 8 (Redondo Records, 2016)
- Last Wave To Surfsville (Redondo Records, 2023)

=== Singles ===
- Mickey's Car/Yesterday's Summer (Lover's Leap, 1983)
- Pray For Sun/Surfin' Chinese (Lover's Leap, 1985)
- Spirit of Australia/Worst Surfer on the Beach (Lux-Noise, 1990)
- Beach Bound/Camaro Custom (No Tomorrow, 1994)

=== EPs ===
- Surf-Jet Girl (Big Beat, 1986)
- Tell' Em I'm Surfin' (with Shock Treatment) (No Tomorrow, 1999)
- The Godfather (No Tomorrow, 2000)
- Boss Beach Party (No Tomorrow, 2003)
- Holy Guacamole (No Tomorrow, 2004)

=== Compilation albums/EP appearances ===
- Hang 11 (Mutant Surf Punks) – "Who Stole the Summer?" (Anagram Records, 1985)
- Big Beat Beach Party – "Surf Taboo/Down at The 'B' Club" (Big Beat, 1985)
- Roccopolacion 87 – "The Munsters Theme" (Rocco Records, 1987)
- Jan & Dean Tribute EP – "New Girl in School" (Surfin' Again, 1987)
- Munster Dance Hall EP – "The Munsters Theme" (Munster Records, 1987)
- Surf & Skate Riot – "Let 'Em Eat Surf" (Tres 60 Records, 1989)
- A-Sides – "Spirit of Australia" (Lux-Noise, 1991)
- Salvese Quien Pueda (Sampler) – "I Don't Wanna Ride That Rollercoaster" & "Bo Diddley Woddie" (No Tomorrow, 1996)
- SurcoSound (CD with Factory magazine) – "Beach Bound" (Surco Records, 1996)
- California Music Magazine CD – "I Don't Wanna Ride That Rollercoaster" & "The Beach Will Never Die" (1996)
- Remember The Beach – "Redondo Moon & Born to the Beach" (Surfin' Records, 1996)
- The Missing Chord – "Vostok 1" (Snatch Records, 1997)
- Loose Drive (Sampler) – "Spirit of Australia" (RPM Records, 1998)
- No Tomorrow 1993–1998 (Sampler) – "The Godfather" (No Tomorrow, 1998)
- Whole Lotta Shakin' 2004 – "Surfin' To Forget About You" (Garage-Pop Records, 2004)
- Countdown To Christmas – "Frosty The Snowman" (Three Kings Records, 2004)
- Guesting on the Veterans CD – "Hula Girl", "Oceanside Park", "Be True To Your School" (It's Alive Records, 2008)
