= List of Doc Savage radio episodes =

Doc Savage made it to the radio three times: 1934–35, 1943 and 1985. The 1934–35 episodes were 15 minutes each and were written by Lester Dent. Episodes 27–52 were repeats of the 1934 episodes. The 1943 episodes were 30 minutes long. Episodes 76–78 were repeats of selected 1943 episodes. All the scripts were credited to Lester Dent; no recordings of any episode, nor records of cast or crew exist. Some scripts are preserved.

== List ==
The 1985 National Public Radio episodes were 30 minutes each. They were two series, Fear Cay (episodes 79–85) and The Thousand-Headed Man (episodes 86–91).

| Episode | Title | Air date |
|---|---|---|
| 1 | The Red Death | 02/10/1934 |
| 2 | The Golden Legacy | 02/17/1934 |
| 3 | The Red Lake Quest | 02/24/1934 |
| 4 | The Sniper in The Sky | 03/03/1934 |
| 5 | The Evil Extortionists | 03/10/1934 |
| 6 | Black-Light Magic | 03/17/1934 |
| 7 | Radium Scramble | 03/24/1934 |
| 8 | Death Had Blue Hands | 03/31/1934 |
| 9 | The Sinister Sleep | 04/07/1934 |
| 10 | The Southern Star Mystery | 04/14/1934 |
| 11 | The Impossible Bullet | 04/21/1934 |
| 12 | The Too-talkative Parrot | 04/28/1934 |
| 13 | The Blue Angel | 05/05/1934 |
| 14 | The Green Ghost | 05/12/1934 |
| 15 | The Box of Fear | 05/19/1934 |
| 16 | The Phantom Terror | 05/26/1934 |
| 17 | Mantrap Mesa | 06/02/1934 |
| 18 | Fast Workers | 06/09/1934 |
| 19 | Needle in a Chinese Haystack | 06/16/1934 |
| 20 | Monk Called it Justice | 06/23/1934 |
| 21 | The White Haired Devil | 06/30/1934 |
| 22 | The Oilfield Ogres | 07/07/1934 |
| 23 | The Fainting Lady | 07/14/1934 |
| 24 | Poison Cargo | 07/21/1934 |
| 25 | Find Curley Morgan | 07/28/1934 |
| 26 | The Growing Wizard | 08/04/1934 |
| 53 | Doc Savage | 01/06/1943 |
| 54 | Return From Death | 01/13/1943 |
| 55 | Note of Death | 01/20/1943 |
| 56 | Murder Charm | 01/27/1943 |
| 57 | Death Stalks The Morgue | 02/03/1943 |
| 58 | I'll Dance On Your Grave | 02/10/1943 |
| 59 | Murder Is a Business | 02/17/1943 |
| 60 | Living Evil | 02/24/1943 |
| 61 | Journey Into Oblivion | 03/03/1943 |
| 62 | Hour of Murder | 03/10/1943 |
| 63 | Pharaoh's Wisdom | 03/17/1943 |
| 64 | Society Amazonia | 03/24/1943 |
| 65 | Insect Menace | 03/31/1943 |
| 66 | Subway to Hell | 04/07/1943 |
| 67 | Monster of The Sea | 04/14/1943 |
| 68 | The Voice That Cried 'Kill!' | 04/21/1943 |
| 69 | Cult of Satan | 04/28/1943 |
| 70 | When Dead Men Walk | 05/05/1943 |
| 71 | The Screeching Ghost | 05/12/1943 |
| 72 | Ransom or Death | 05/19/1943 |
| 73 | Murder Man | 05/26/1943 |
| 74 | Miracle Maniac | 06/02/1943 |
| 75 | Skull Man | 06/09/1943 |
| 79 | Kidnapped | 09/30/1985 |
| 80 | The Hanging Man | 10/07/1985 |
| 81 | The Disappointing Parcel | 10/14/1985 |
| 82 | The Island of Death | 10/21/1985 |
| 83 | Terror Underground | 10/28/1985 |
| 84 | The Mysterious Weeds | 11/04/1985 |
| 85 | The Crawling Terror | 11/11/1985 |
| 86 | The Black Stick | 11/18/1985 |
| 87 | Three Black Sticks | 11/25/1985 |
| 88 | Flight Into Fear | 12/02/1985 |
| 89 | Pagoda of The Hands | 12/09/1985 |
| 90 | The Accursed City | 12/16/1985 |
| 91 | The Deadly Treasure | 12/23/1985 |
