= Caja de Muertos Island =

Island on southern coast of Puerto Rico

Caja de Muertos
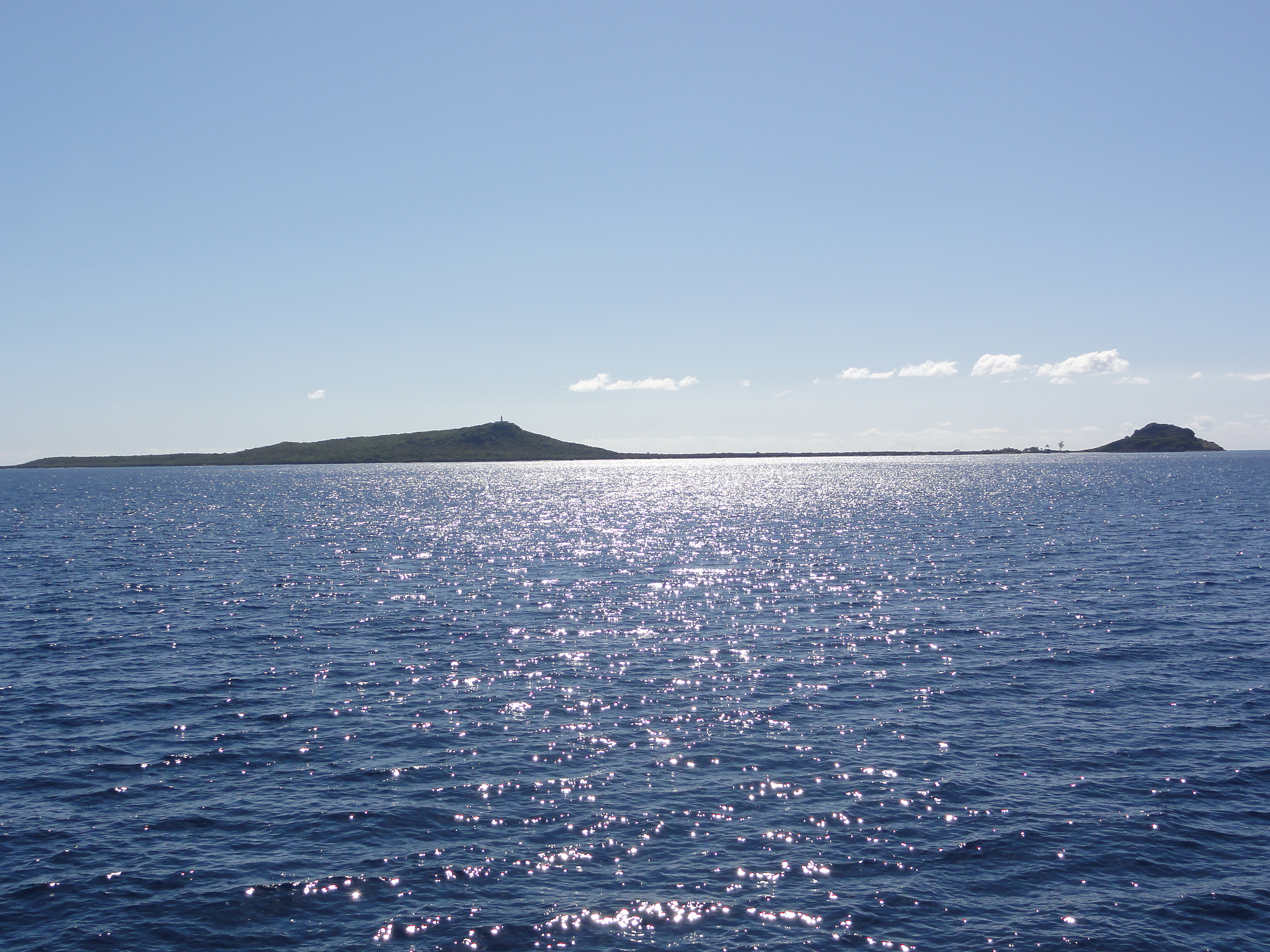
- Profile of Caja de Muertos from the mainland in the municipalities of Ponce (top) and Juana Díaz (bottom)

- Location within Puerto Rico Location within Lesser Antilles Location within the Caribbean Location within North America Location within Earth

Geography
- Location: Ponce, Puerto Rico
- Coordinates: 17°53′41″N 66°31′8″W
- Archipelago: Puerto Rico
- Area: 1.54 km^{2} (0.59 sq mi)
- Length: 2.75 km (1.709 mi)
- Width: 0.86 km (0.534 mi)
- Highest elevation: 52 m (171 ft)

Administration
- United States
- Commonwealth: Puerto Rico
- Municipality: Ponce
- Barrio: Playa

Caja de Muertos (lit. 'Chest of the Dead'; also in English: Deadman's Chest or Coffin Island) is an uninhabited island off the southern coast of the main island of Puerto Rico, in the municipality of Ponce. The island and its surrounding waters are protected by the Caja de Muertos Nature Reserve, because of its native turtle traffic and ecological value of its dry forests and reefs. Hikers and beachgoers are often seen in the island, which can be reached by ferry from the La Guancha Boardwalk sector of Ponce Playa. Together with Cardona, Ratones, Morrillito, Isla del Frio, Gatas, and Isla de Jueyes, Caja de Muertos is one of seven islands ascribed to the municipality of Ponce.

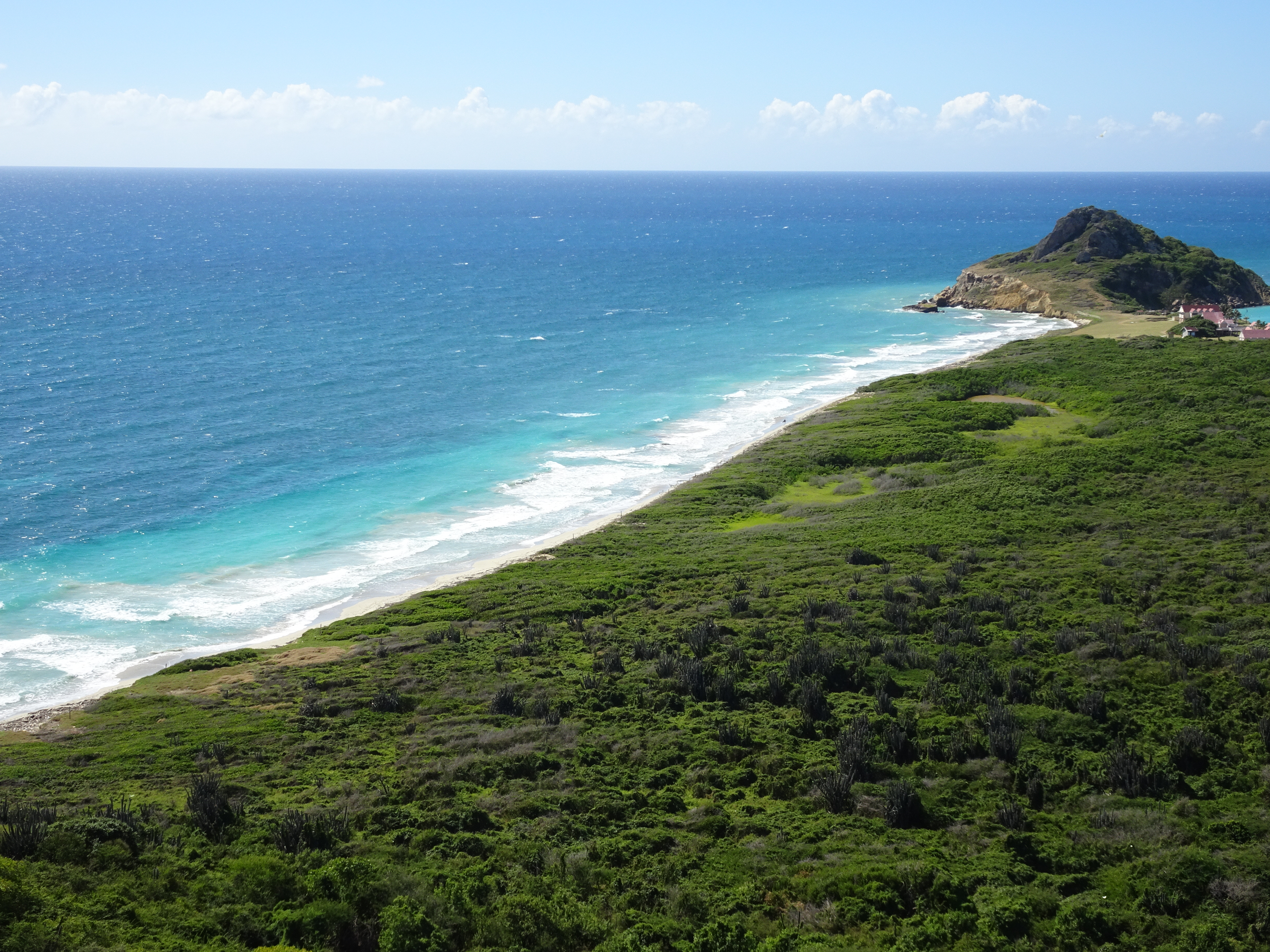
Playa Larga beach in Caja de Muertos, 2016

== History ==
Stone art left on the island attests it has been visited by man over milennnia. Taíno natives made frequent trips to the island on fishing expeditions, and when they were colonized by the Spanish during the 1511 battle of Spanish–Taíno War for Borikén, the natives attempted a retreat to the Caja de Muertos but shortly afterwards were either captured or killed. During much of the 17th century, the island is known to have been used as a hideout by pirates and mutineers. For example, in 1599-1600 it was used by a group merchants-turned-pirates who, after learning of a Portuguese ship filled with gold, silver, precious stones, and other treasures, attacked it and appropriated its contents. As they attempted to travel back to England, though, they faced an attempted mutiny and, surviving it, took refuge at Caja de Muertos. Venturing to the Puerto Rico mainland for provisions, they were killed, except for one, who later confessed to the existence of the hidden treasure. The Spanish colonial governor then appropriated the remaining treasure for construction projects, among other uses.

In 1842, the first known map was drafted using the name of the island as it is known today. In 1880 the Spanish government started construction of a lighthouse on the island, completing it in 1887. During the 19th century, the island was also a hideout for Puerto Rican patriots who sought independence from Spain. Some of the patriots who hid there include Ramón Emeterio Betances and Segundo Ruiz Belvis. During these decades it was the secret meeting places of masons when they were persecuted on the mainland. In 1928, Cayetano Coll y Toste wrote a novel titled "El Tesoro del Pirata Almeida" (The Treasure of Pirate Almeida) inspired by Caja de Muertos island, and in 1883, it inspired Robert Louis Stevenson to write the novel "Treasure Island".

In 1898, at the time of the American invasion, the island had a population of 64 permanent residents, and a decade later only 16 residents remained. These residents had no fresh water in the island, so water was brought in from the mainland when, during periods of little rain, it could not be collected from the rainfall. The island eventually became uninhabited, except for the lightkeepers. In 1945 when the island's lighthouse was automated, there was no longer a need to have lighthouse keepers and the island became deserted. After this, the island became a vacationing spot for some owners of private vessels who might venture to the island for a day trip or for fishing.

On January 2, 1980 the island was declared a nature reserve by act of the Puerto Rico Legislature and entrusted to the Puerto Rico Department of Natural Resources to be guarded and administered. It is administered in conjunction of the Ponce Municipal Government. In 1985, the Government of Puerto Rico gave its approval for the development of a tourism center at Caja de Muertos. The lighthouse was restored by the Puerto Rico Department of Natural Resources, and for a while housed a museum. The Puerto Rico Ports Authority had public transportation to the Island until 1993; shortly thereafter a company called “Island Venture” started offering daily trips. Service was interrupted twice, after Hurricane Maria and after the 2020 Puerto Rico earthquakes, both of which badly damaged La Guancha, the area on the mainland where passengers boarded the catamarans to the island. The Puerto Rico Department of Natural and Environmental Resources built a dock, barracks for reserve personnel, a small museum, trail signs, and compost bathrooms for tourists.

In 2009, the government of Puerto Rico announced plans to make development of the island and restoration of its lighthouse, both for tourism purposes, a priority of the DRNA. By the summer of 2012, there were three businesses making tour trips there, including one for charter trips only. In 2010, Playa Pelícano received the Blue Flag beach certification. In 2017, much of what DRNA had built was destroyed by Hurricane Maria and the tourist ferry was halted, but restarted about a year later.

However, government inaction following the 2019–20 Puerto Rico earthquakes left the reserve without DRNA rangers for over a year, since the housing structure was severely damaged and not timely repaired or replaced and they limited to maritime patrolling despite having obsolete equipment and expired bulletproof vests. In 2021, the last of three vehicles assigned for this task broke down and the rounds stopped altogether. This had several repercussions on the natural reserve, leading to tourists illegally breaching the perimeter, anchoring in the sand, riding jet skis, camping, hosting parties and vandalizing the remains of the fallen structure. The preservation program that monitors and protect the reproduction habitat of the hawksbill sea turtle was halted, due to the rangers being unable to follow up on their nesting habits, leaving 25 stations unattended.

When queried about the situation in April 2022, the DRNA claimed that the housing structure would eventually be reconstructed since disaster mitigation funds had been approved for that purpose. However, the process was still in the early stage, since the government had yet to name a contractor for the project. The agency also claimed that patrolling had taken place when the boat “was available”.

== Location ==
Caja de Muertos is located 5.2 mi (8.4 km) south of the Puerto Rican mainland and is part of the Playa barrio of Ponce, Puerto Rico, municipality.

== Geography and climate ==
The island measures 2 mi (3 km) long northeast-southwest, and up to 2,822 ft (860 m) wide [1,837 ft (560 m) on the average]. It has an area of 0.59 sq mi (1.53 km^{2}). Close by are Morrillito Key [591 ft (180 m) off the southwest point, 0.02 sq mi (0.05 km^{2})] and Berbería Key [3.9 mi (6.3 km) to the northeast, 0.12 sq mi (0.31 km^{2})], both part of the Caja de Muertos Natural Reserve. Berbería Key belongs to Rio Canas Abajo barrio of Juana Díaz municipality.

The climate is dry and the island supports dry forest. A still-functioning lighthouse, Caja de Muertos Light, established in 1887 and automated in 1945, sits atop the highest hill on the island. This 170 foot high hill is located at the southwest extreme of the island.

== Features ==
The island has four beaches: Pelicano, Playa Larga, Carrucho, and Coast Guard. The island also possesses fauna and flora not found anywhere else in the world. The island has no permanent residents, but the Government of Puerto Rico maintains Department of Natural Resources staff and security personnel there. In 1899, it registered a permanent population of 64 residents, but it since declined to zero.

== Etymology ==
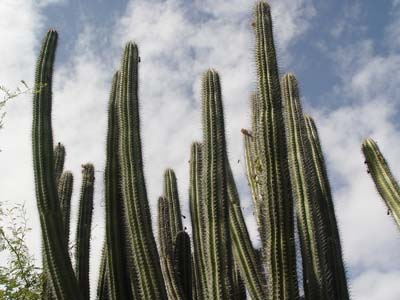
Cactus in the island's dry forest

Since 1511, the island has been called by different names including Isla Abeiranas, Abairianay, Antías, Jutías, Yautías, Utías, Abeianay, Angulo, Isla Bestia, and Isla del Tesoro, in addition to the translations as Coffre A’morr, Deadman’s Chest, and Coffin Island. Caja de Muertos can be translated into English as "Coffin" or "Dead Man's Chest", there is no consensus on how the island got its current name. The official version of the origin of the name, as given by the Puerto Rico Department of Natural Resources, and under whose care the island is currently entrusted, is as follows: "Its name is attributed to the 18th-century French writer Jean-Baptiste Labat who called it Coffre à mort (Caja de Muertos) or Bomba d'Infierno, making reference to the fact that when the island is seen from certain places in southern Puerto Rico, it gives the impression of seeing a dead person laying on a plateau."

=== Etymological theories ===
==== Maritime fiction ====
In 1901, it was suggested by one A. W. Van Buren of Yale University that the island's name may be related to the sea shanty "Dead Man's Chest", first written by Robert Louis Stevenson for his novel Treasure Island; However, no scholar since Van Buren has made this connection nor is there any evidence to support such a claim. Further, Van Buren says that Stevenson did not write the song "Dead man's chest" himself, that he "picked it up somewhere", which is another baseless claim (see "Dead Man's Chest" for more information on the fakelore surrounding this song). Finally, the shanty invented by Stevenson was most likely inspired by a different island, Dead Chest Island, British Virgin Islands.

==== José Joaquim Almeida ====
One story given by Kurt Pitzer and Tara Stevens is that of a Portuguese pirate, José Almeida. A former merchant sailor, Almeida fell in love with a Basque woman in Curaçao, married her in St. Thomas, US Virgin Islands and took her pirating with him around the Caribbean. On the first raid, she was killed by a stray bullet. Distraught, Almeida had her embalmed and placed in a glass box inside a copper coffin. He buried her in a cave in a deserted island near Ponce. He would come every month to gaze over her preserved body and leave half of his treasure in her grave. Almeida, however, was caught in the Puerto Rico mainland, tried, and executed in Castillo San Felipe del Morro in 1832. Many years later, a Spanish engineer discovered the glass and copper coffin, and identifying the cay on a map gave it its present name. The treasure found, if any, was kept secret.

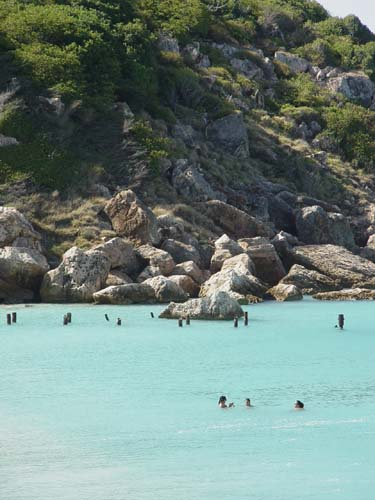
Beachgoers at Pelicano Beach in Caja de Muertos

==== British shipwreck ====
In 1599, several English merchants departed to China with a letter from Queen Elizabeth to the Chinese government. However, the expedition was dangerous and a ship was lost to the weather. Off the Indian coast the group turned to piracy and after learning of a Portuguese ship filled with gold, silver, precious stones, other treasures and other valuables (spices, silk, some clothing), they attacked and captured the vessel. The fleet managed to capture another vessel, but in the process lost its flagship and a large part of the crew was fatally injured, including the fleet commander. Shorthanded, the group decided to return to England aboard a smaller ship, taking part of the loot with them. After surviving an attempted mutiny, the Englishmen decided to take a canoe left behind by a frigate off Puerto Rico's eastern coast from where they took refuge at Caja de Muertos. Losing the smaller vessel, the Englishmen traveled to the main island in search of provisions, but one of them left behind to mind the canoe was captured and let the presence of the treasure known to the local authorities.

This led to an incursion to take the treasure, where all but one of the Englishmen were suddenly executed despite negotiations and the Spanish took the treasure with them and reported it as being captured in a battle with the English. The lone survivor, named Thomas, managed to build a makeshift boat out of wood remnants and drifted to Puerto Rico, being taken to San Germán and telling his version of the events. The governor of Puerto Rico grew suspicious and an investigation was held between the autumn of 1599 and early 1600, which lead to a confession by one of the murderers. The authorities then began confiscating the treasure seized during the incursion, with other parts disappearing and reportedly ending in the hands of the governor's own nephew. The treasure confiscated was auctioned, with about 4,000 ducats of Indian silver remaining by 1602. The following governor employed another part in construction, with a collection of jewels and bars that were left behind being sold. The last piece, a large gemstone, was sent abroad for transport to Spain. From these events, the island would gain the moniker of "Isla de Caja de Muertos" ("Dead Man’s Chest").

== Natural reserve ==
The island was designated as a nature reserve in 1980 after a meeting was held in Puerto Rico by the Puerto Rico Planning Board wherein they considered the recommendation set forth by the Coastal Management Zone Program to turn the island into a protected wilderness area. The island has remained a protected area ever since. The protection is mainly due to its heavy turtle traffic which is an endangered species.

== Beaches ==
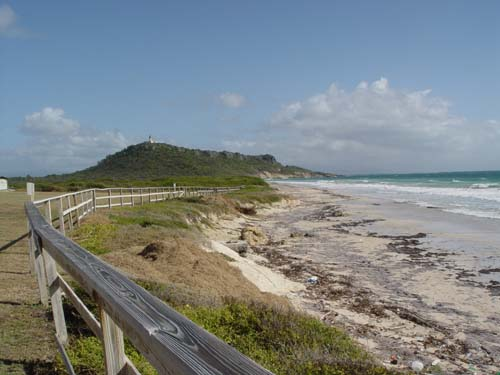
Playa Larga, above, is part of the protected area of the island

The island is home to five beaches: Playa Pelícano, Playa Ensenadita ("Pocitas"), Playa Larga, Playa Blanca (also called Playa Coast Guard), and Playa Chica. Playa Pelícano has been named a Blue Flag beach.

- Playa Pelícano - located on the western (docking) side of the island, between the boat dock and Cerro Morrillo.
- Playa Ensenadita ("Pocitas")
- Playa Larga - a protected (and thus not accessible) beach on the southeastern side (the open Caribbean Sea side) of the island between Cerro Morrillo and Caja de Muertos Light.
- Playa Blanca (Playa Coast Guard) - located on the northwest side of the island (facing the city of Ponce), northwest of the Caja de Muertos Light.
- Playa Chica (Playa Carrucho) - located on the northern and northeastern end the island, facing the Puerto Rico mainland.

== See also ==
- List of islands of Ponce, Puerto Rico
- List of beaches in Ponce, Puerto Rico
