= Deadman's Island =

Deadman's Island or variations on the name may refer to:

== Places ==
=== Canada ===
- Deadman's Island in Vancouver's Coal Harbour
- Deadman's Island in the Northwest Arm of Halifax Harbour
- The original name for Halkett Island, in Victoria's Inner Harbour
- Deadman's Island and the former Deadman's Island Provincial Park, now part of Burns Lake Park in the town of Burns Lake, British Columbia
- Deadman Islands, Nunavut, Canada

=== United States ===
- Deadman's Island (San Pedro), a now-vanished island near San Pedro, Los Angeles, California
- Deadman Island (Solano County), an island near Suisun Bay, California
- Deadman Island, part of the San Juan Islands in Washington

=== United Kingdom ===
- Deadman's Island (Kent), an island in the estuary of the River Medway

== Other uses ==
- Dead Man's Island (film), a 1996 U.S. telemovie

== See also ==
- Dead Man's Chest Island (disambiguation)
- Isle of the Dead (disambiguation)
- Island of the Dead (disambiguation)
- Dead Island (series), a survival-horror videogame series
