= Dead Chest Island, British Virgin Islands =

Island in the British Virgin Islands

Dead Chest Island
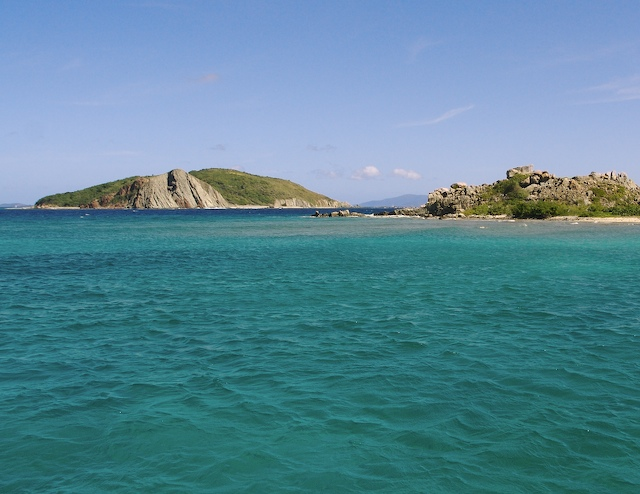
- Dead Chest island as viewed from Deadman's Bay, Peter Island

- The location of Dead Chest Island within the British Virgin Islands

- Location within British Virgin Islands Location within the Caribbean

Geography
- Location: Caribbean Sea
- Coordinates: 18°21′57″N 64°33′48″W
- Archipelago: Virgin Islands

Administration
- United Kingdom; British Virgin Islands
- British Overseas Territory: British Virgin Islands

Additional information
- Time zone: AST (UTC-4)
- ISO code: VG

Dead Chest Island is an island located half a mile north east (0.4 miles at 27 degrees true) of Deadman's Bay on Peter Island, British Virgin Islands. It is uninhabited, has no fresh water or trees and only sparse vegetation. It was formerly used as a firing range by the Royal Virgin Islands Police, but the opening of the nearby hotel on Peter Island coincided with the decision to build a proper firing range on the island of Tortola. The island is now an uninhabited National Park, with several popular scuba diving and snorkeling sites.

== Blackbeard and Stevenson ==
According to an apocryphal story, the pirate Blackbeard marooned his crew on Dead Chest Island as punishment, leaving them with nothing but a cutlass and a bottle of rum each. How many pirates, and how many days, varies according to the source retelling the story. By the end of the month, only a few of pirates were left alive. Because the earliest known references to this story are from the 20th century, it is almost certainly fakelore derived from Robert Louis Stevenson's song "Dead Man's Chest", which first appeared in his novel Treasure Island in 1883. The chorus of "Dead Man's Chest" is as follows:

Fifteen men on the dead man's chest—
...Yo-ho-ho, and a bottle of rum!
Drink and the devil had done for the rest—
...Yo-ho-ho, and a bottle of rum!

Stevenson found the name "Dead Man's Chest" among a list of island names in a book by Charles Kingsley and said "Treasure Island came out of Kingsley's At Last: A Christmas in the West Indies (1871); where I got the 'Dead Man's Chest' - that was the seed". Kingsley had written in At Last: "Unfortunately, English buccaneers have since then [1493] have given to most of them [the Virgin Islands] less poetic names. The Dutchman's Cap, Broken Jerusalem, The Dead Man's Chest, Rum Island, and so forth, mark a time and a race more prosaic, but still more terrible, though not one whit more wicked and brutal, than the Spanish conquistadores." In other words, the song is not based on a former legend, it is entirely new as of 1883 and original with Stevenson. While the two names are not exactly the same ("Dead Man's Chest" vs "Dead Chest"), the similarities are striking, and there are no other islands named like it in the Virgin Islands, suggesting they are one and the same. If on the other hand the island "Dead Man's Chest" referenced by Kingsley in At Last is not the same as the island known today as "Dead Chest Island", then there would be no connection between "Dead Chest Island" and Stevenson's song "Dead Man's Chest", since Stevenson's song is in reference to Kingsley's island.

In 1994, a journalist, Quentin van Marle, spent 31 days alone on the island as a voluntary castaway, beating the supposed record of Blackbeard's pirates and in commemoration of the centenary of Robert Louis Stevenson's death.

== See also ==
- Little Sisters, a group of the smaller islands of the British Virgin Islands
- Caja de Muertos
