= Bahía de Ponce =

Bay in Ponce, Puerto Rico

- Ponce Bay
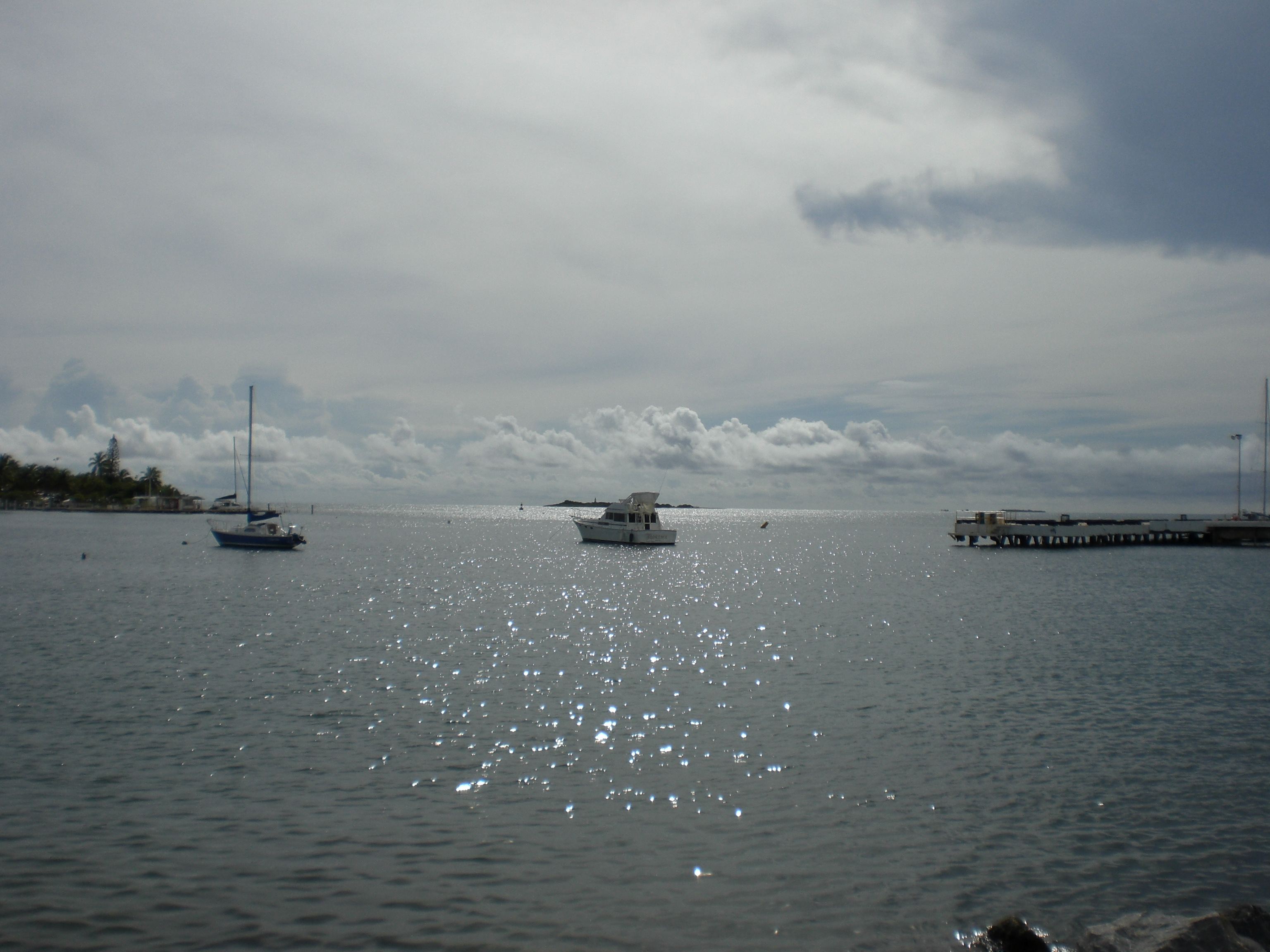
- Partial view of Bahia de Ponce, with Isla de Gatas on the left, Isla Cardona on the far background and Punta Peñoncillo on the right (photo taken looking WSW from La Guancha)

- Bahía de Ponce, in Ponce, Puerto Rico
- Location: Ponce, Puerto Rico
- Coordinates: 17°58′28.5954″N 66°38′9.168″W
- Type: Bay
- Etymology: Municipality of Ponce
- Primary inflows: Rio Matilde
- River sources: Rio Matilde
- Ocean/sea sources: Caribbean Sea
- Basin countries: Puerto Rico
- Managing agency: Ponce Municipal Government
- Max. length: 1.5 mi (2.4 km)
- Max. width: 3.5 mi (5.6 km)
- Surface area: 5.25 sq mi (13.6 km^{2})
- Average depth: 36 ft (11 m)
- Max. depth: 50 ft (15 m)
- Salinity: 35.7 (Note: Surface salinity at surface temperature of 28.4 °C, as measured on 3 June 1971.)
- Shore length^{1}: 4.0 mi (6.4 km)
- Islands: Isla Cardona, Isla de Gatas
- Settlements: Barrio Playa, Ponce
- ^{1} Shore length is not a well-defined measure.

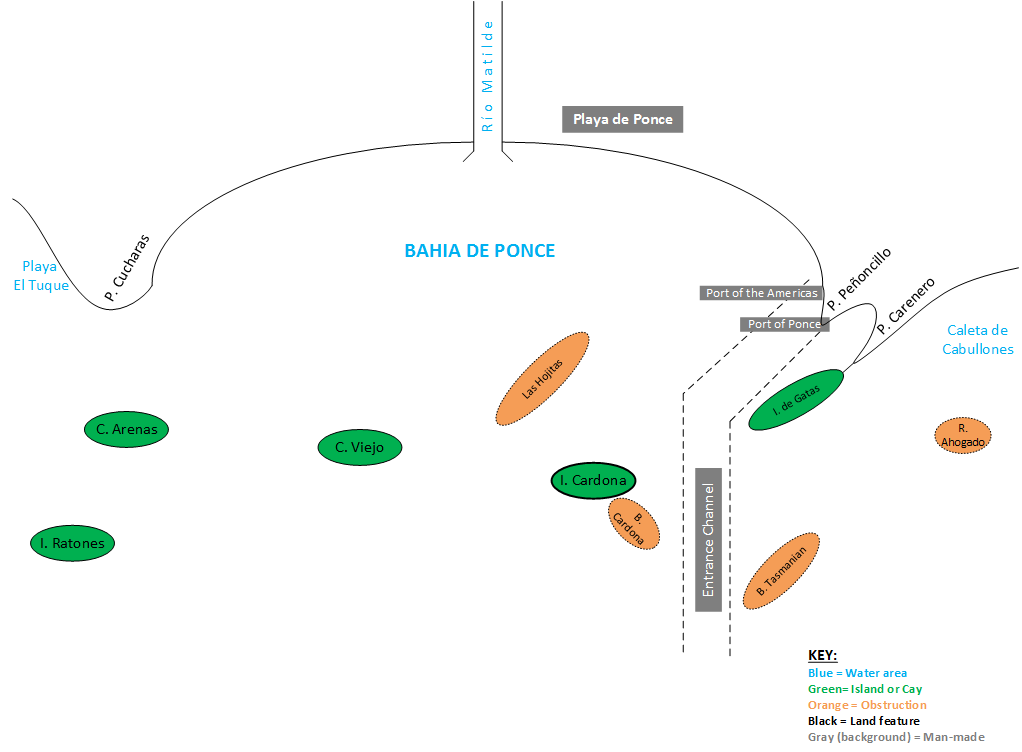
Sketch of Bahía de Ponce

Bahía de Ponce (Ponce Bay) is a bay in Barrio Playa, Ponce, Puerto Rico. The Bay is home to the most important commercial harbor on the Puerto Rico south coast and the second largest in Puerto Rico. The Cardona Island Light is located on the Bay to mark the way into the Bay from the nearby Caja de Muertos Light.

Bahía de Ponce is located in southern Puerto Rico, about midway on the southern coast. It has a width of 3.5 mi (5.6 km), a length of 1.5 miles, its shore is about 4.0 mi (6.4 km) and its area is approximately 3,300 acres (13 km^{2}). Typical bay depths are in the 20 ft (6.1 m)-to-40 ft (12 m) range, but these dip to 50 feet (15 m) at the drenched piers.

The Bay provides recreation, sightseeing and tourist attractions. It also provides for commercial and industrial activities. The Rafael Cordero Santiago Port of the Americas is located here as well as the La Guancha Recreational and Cultural Complex, the La Guancha Boardwalk, and Club Náutico de Ponce. The annual Cruce a Nado Internacional swimming sports event is held at this Bay every September.

== History ==
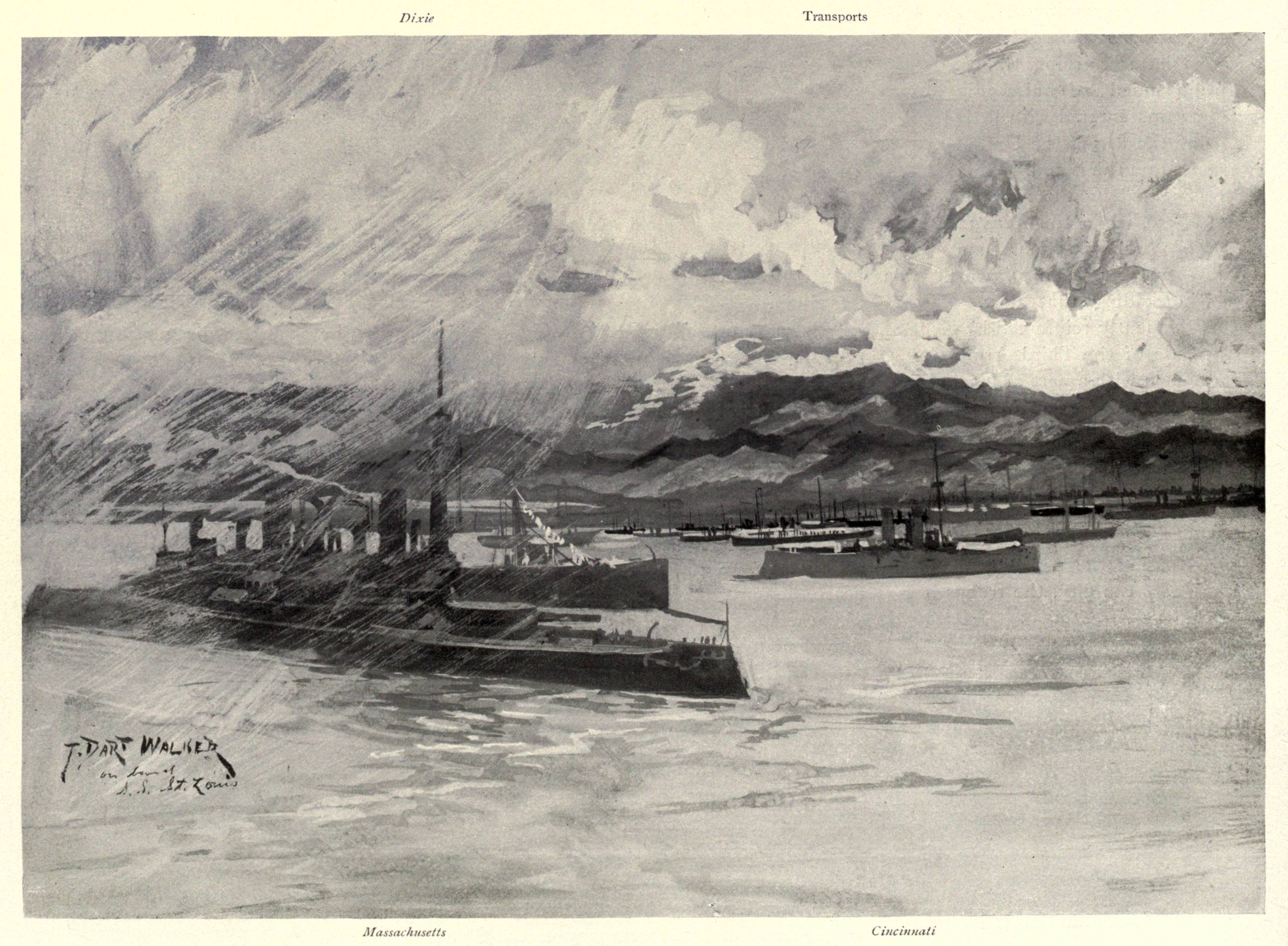
A depiction of 27 July 1898 US troopships and convoy at Bahía de Ponce during the 1898 American invasion

The history of the Bahía de Ponce is closely tied to the history of Barrio Playa, the populated place that lines Bahía de Ponce's shores. As the major means of external communication for the settlement at Ponce, barrio Playa has, in turn, a history that is as old as the history of the city of Ponce itself, dating to the 16th century, when Barrio Playa used to be called Montones.

During the 1600s and 1700s, significant contraband took place near Ponce shores as well as attempts to attack, ransack, and invade the Playa settlement. A lookout post was set up in the El Vigia Hill, located immediately north of the city to warn the city of the need of help in the Playa harbor, a small port settlement at the time. Despite the threats, the Port of Ponce started operations at Bahía de Ponce under Spanish sovereignty in February 1789 and in just a few years became Puerto Rico's most important port.

But threat from sea upon the Puerto Rican shore settlement continued. In both August 1800 and October 1801, for example, a fleet of British warships attempted to capture the shore settlement but were repelled by the Municipal Guard and Ponce militia. The Port of Ponce was officially founded in 1804 by Order of the Spanish Crown, but it was not until 1811 that the Order was carried out, when Ramon Power y Giralt obtained a Royal Decree to enable the port. The Port was built with municipal funds and, unlike all other ports in Puerto Rico, it is not administered by the Central Government in San Juan but by the Ponce Municipal Government.

The waters off Bahía de Ponce saw significant amounts of piracy during this period as well. In 1825, the last major pirate in the Caribbean, Roberto Cofresí, was apprehended after two armed Spanish sloops docked at Bahía de Ponce and the American schooner Grampus hunted down pirate.

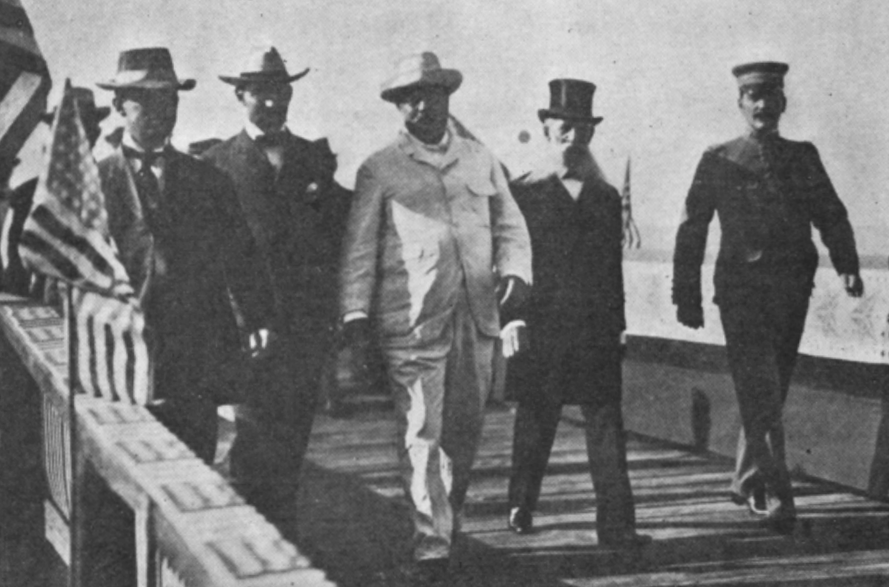
President Roosevelt on his visit to Puerto Rico via Bahía de Ponce on 21 November 1906

By the 1830s, La Playa had one of the best roads in Puerto Rico (today's Avenida Hostos), connecting the shore settlement to the city proper, and La Playa was the center of Ponce's commercial activity. As a result, most advances, innovation and progress often happened in La Playa before it happened in the city of Ponce. For example, Barrio Playa subsequently also got the first phone line in Ponce and was also the first one to get railroad service from downtown Ponce.

In 1845, however, La Playa experienced a major fire that destroyed Barrio Playa and most of the Ponce vicinity. It significantly damaged the Spanish Customs House in Ponce, this being one of the few building left standing after the fire. The fire burned down the major buildings of the "Marina de Ponce" (Ponce port) as well.

In 1887 the Spanish government built the Caja de Muertos Light on an island by the same name just off the coast of barrio Playa. This was followed by the building of Cardona Island Light lighthouse in 1889, on a small island called Isla Cardona located at the entrance of Bahía de Ponce. Both of these islands are part of barrio Playa.

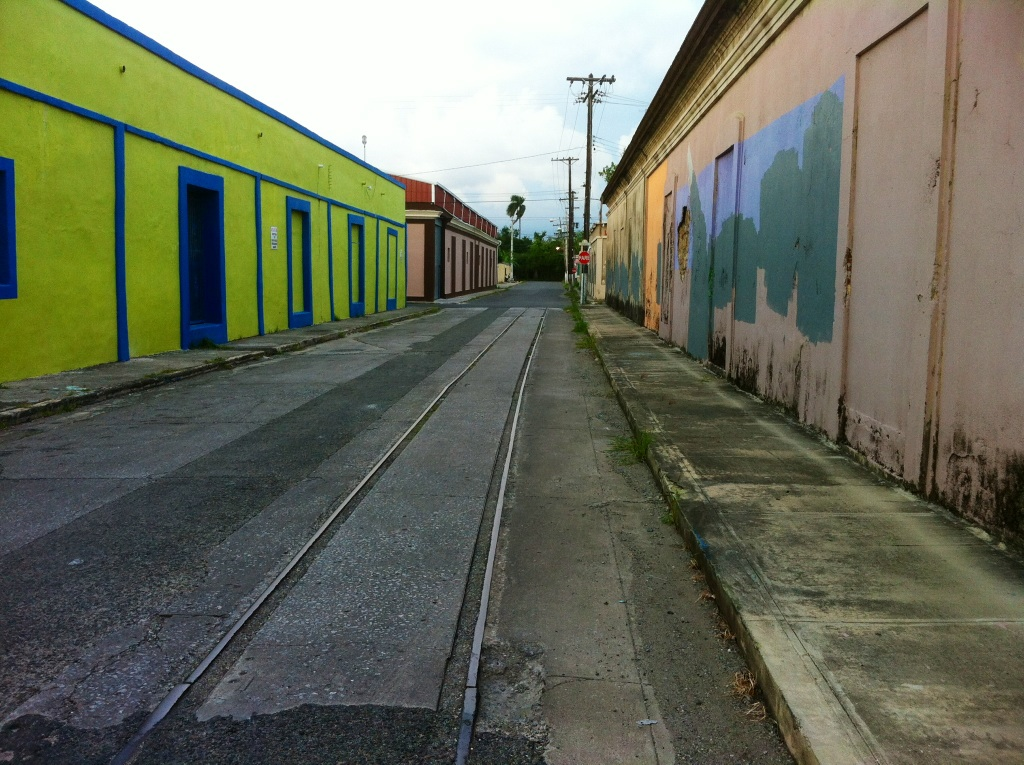
A 2012 photo showing the defunct street rail line used to move goods from the Port to Playa warehouses

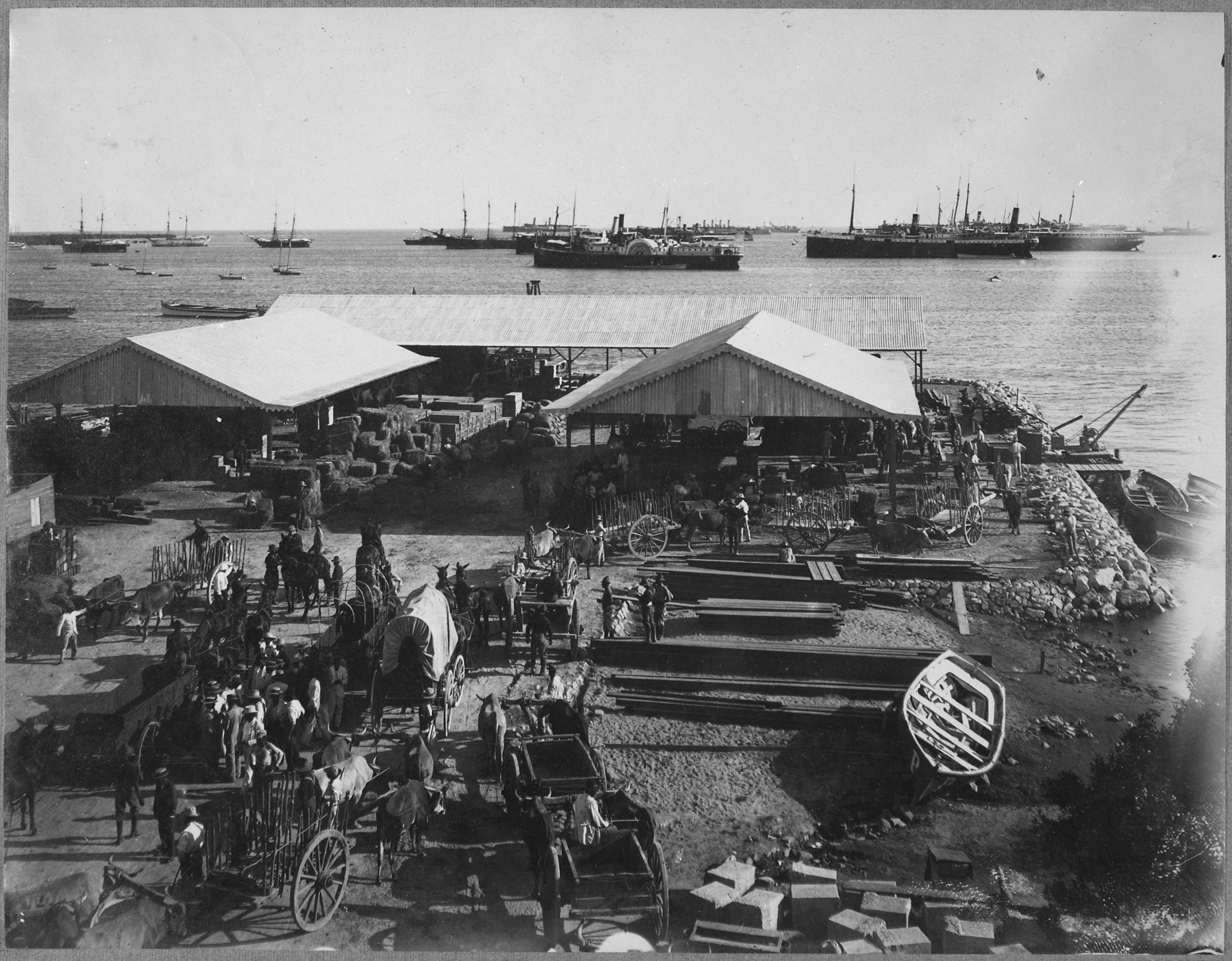
Commercial activity at Port of Ponce in 1899

In 1898, Bahía de Ponce was the entry point of the invading forces of the United States on 27 July. Relative to the other ports on the Island at the time, the Port of Ponce had better facilities and its harbor could accommodate large ships. (Note: In 1911 the U.S. Federal Government granted the City of Ponce a perpetual franchise to operate the Port. During the second decade of the 20th century (1910s), a new harbor was built. (See La Vuelta de la Feria: Segunda Parte del Juguete Cómico "Los Jíbaros Progresistas o La Feria de Ponce", Original y en Verso." Ramon Mendez Quiñones. Tipografía "El Vapor". Ponce, Puerto Rico. 28 July 1882. Archivo Digital Nacional de Puerto Rico. p. 244 (footnote). Accessed 5 April 2019.) The new Port of Ponce was built on Punta Peñoncillo, where it currently (2019) stands.) It was also used by U.S. president Theodore Roosevelt on 21 November 1906 in his visit to the island. The American forces in Puerto Rico built a new pier at Avenida Hostos Final for his visit, though this pier no longer exists. In a speech to Congress three weeks later President Roosevelt explained "I could not [dis]embark at San Juan because the harbor has not been dredged out and cannot receive an American battleship."

By 1913, Playa was "a dynamic neighborhood with a self-sustained urban development with a population of 5,169 distributed through a residential area dominated by wooden houses, sugar cane farms, churches, schools, hospitals, a cemetery and local industries that promoted the formation of a strong artisan and industrial workers class." Playa has been called "Puerto Rico's first planned suburban area".

In 2009, Barrio Playa was a mostly working class barrio of Ponce, with a modern shopping mall, a 4-star hotel, several parks, and numerous sports and recreational facilities, among others, and its bay is home to the most important commercial harbor on the Puerto Rico's Caribbean coast and the second largest in the island.

== Topography ==
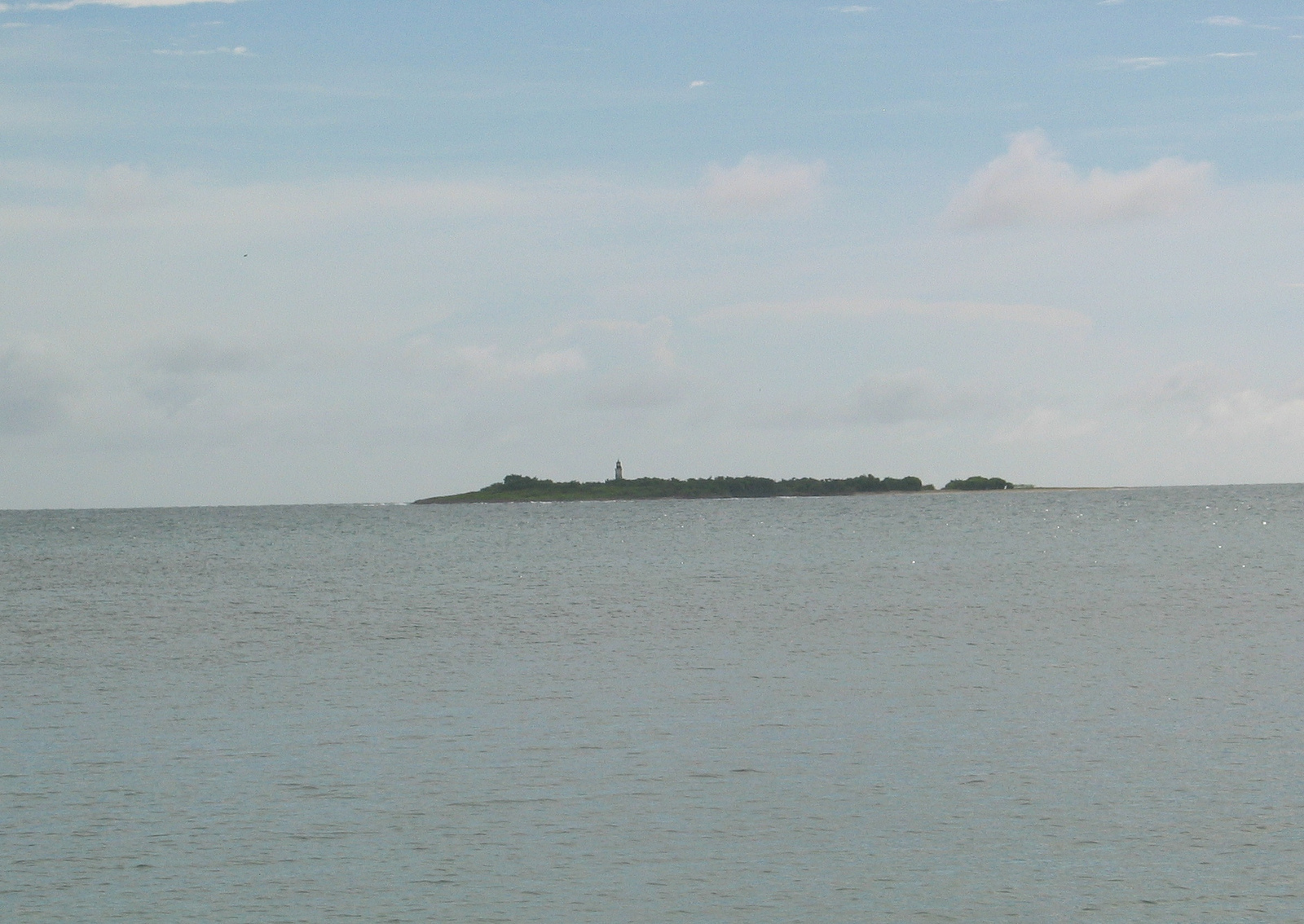
Isla Cardona, located at the entrance to the Bahía de Ponce. (Photo taken from Isla de Gatas, looking southwest)

The Bay is bounded in the west by Punta Cucharas and in the east by Punta Carenero, in the south by the Caribbean Sea and in the north by Barrio Playa and Barrio Canas. In years past, Río Portugués and Río Matilde both emptied into the Bay, but since the 1970s only Río Matilde empties there now. El Tuque beach is the next water feature immediately west of Bahía de Ponce, and Isla de Gatas Inlet is the next one immediately to the east.

The land masses at Punta Peñoncillo and Isla de Gatas protect the bay from the prevailing east winds, but the bay is exposed to the Caribbean Sea on the South. Isla de Cardona island, located about the middle of the entrance to the bay, is home to the Isla Cardona Light which is located roughly in the middle of the island. Isla de Gatas is located south of the Port of Ponce piers. Once a land mass fully surrounded by water, Isla de Gatas is now part of mainland Puerto Rico after it was connected to Puerto Rico's Punta Carenero by a dike in the 1960s.

The building of the Port of the Americas will claim 70 acres of bay space for land use.

== Hydrography ==
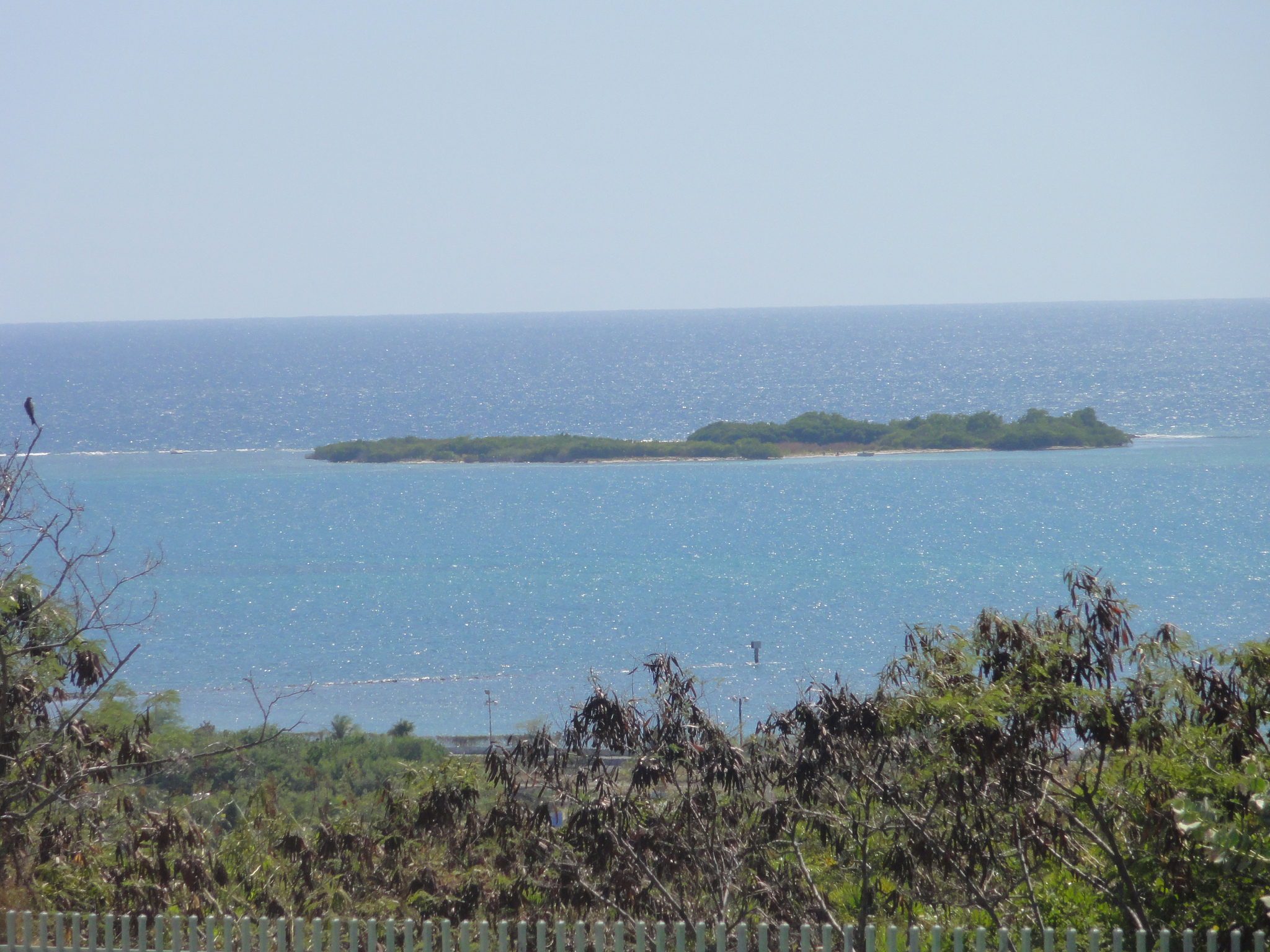
Isla de Ratones vessel obstruction at Bahía de Ponce (Photo taken from the north looking south, with the open Caribbean Sea in the background)

The continental shelf at Bahía de Ponce is over 5 miles wide, after which it dips steeply into the Venezuelan Basin. Maritime obstructions for vessels entering the Bay include seven features: Bajo Tasmanian, Bajo Cardona, Roca Ahogado, Las Hojitas, Cayo Viejo, Isla de Ratones and Cayo Arenas. Bajo Tasmanian is a mile-long bank to the east of the harbor entrance, with several points with shallow depths (16 to 18 feet deep). The part closes to the entrance channel has depths as shallow as about 20 feet. Bajo Cardona extends 600 yards east-southeast from Isla de Cardona; it has depths of 12 to 16 feet. With an east wind of 25 knots or more, the mud from the reef off Isla de Gatas discolors the water across the channel to Isla de Cardona and beyond making the channel off the piers at Punta Peñoncillo appear shoal. Roca Ahogado is a bare rock in the middle of Caleta de Cabullones, to the east of Bahía de Ponce with shoal water of 4 to 18 feet extending up to 0.2-mile from it. Oriented in a northeast direction, Las Hojitas, northwest of Isla de Cardona, is 0.8-mile long and has a small patch awash near its southwest end. The reef has depths of 2 to 11 feet. Cayo Viejo, located 0.8-mile west of Isla de Cardona, is about 0.3-mile in diameter and awash at its shoalest point. Isla de Ratones, on the west entrance to the Bay and a mile offshore, is a low island with a reef that bares at low water extending a mile east-southeast of it. Cayo Arenas, located 0.5-mile east of Isla de Ratones, is surrounded by a reef and shoals that extend up to 200 yards from its shore. The principal entrance to the Bay is east of Isla de Cardona. There is a 600-foot-wide entrance channel which is 36 feet deep, then an inner channel 200-foot-wide 36 feet deep leading to an irregular shaped turning basin, with a 950-foot turning diameter adjacent to the municipal bulkhead. The entrance channel is marked by lights, and buoys. A 0.2-mile-wide channel between Isla de Cardona and Las Hojitas is available for use by small vessels.

== Oceanography ==
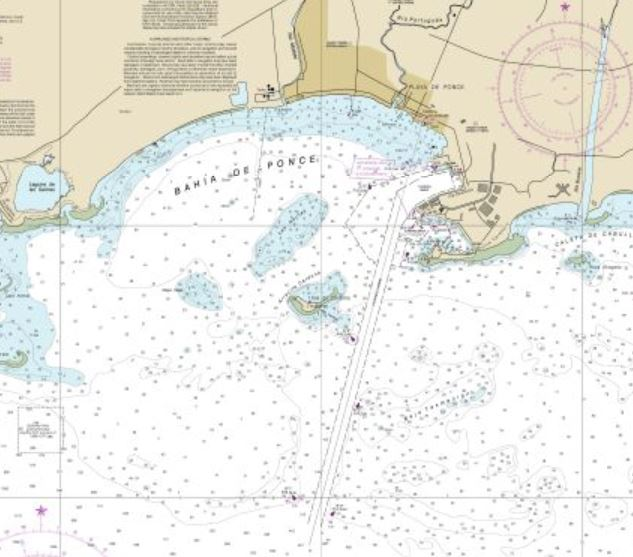
Mercator projection of Bahía de Ponce (See HERE for the Hi-Res version)

Bahía de Ponce is located between Cabo Rojo Light in Cabo Rojo (32 miles west of Bahía de Ponce) and Punta Tuna Light in Maunabo (43 miles to the east). The bay has a width of 3.5 mi (5.6 km), (Note: In Determinacion de la Presencia y Concentracion de Metales Pesados en la Reserva Natural Punta Cucharas de Ponce, Puerto Rico, Abner J. Colon-Ortiz (PUCPR) and Jennifer Sotomayor Pabon (PUCPR), p.19 (see here) state the western end of the Bahía, known as RNPC, is located "some 5 km west of the port facilities", which are about 0.5 km short of the extreme eastern end of the Bahía . ("Determinacion de la Presencia..." was reprinted in Scientific International Journal as "Presencia y Concentracion de metales pesados", Vol 13, No. 2, May–August 2016, pp 17–31)) a length of 1.5 miles, its shore is about 4.0 mi (6.4 km) and its area is approximately 3,300 acres (13 km^{2}). Typical bay depths are in the 20 ft (6.1 m)-to-40 ft (12 m) range, but these dip to 50 feet (15 m) at the drenched piers.

Wind patterns at Bahía de Ponce are generally from the east, with a southeast onshore component. Average east-southeast knots of 7.7 miles per hour exists year-around, with March being the windiest month. The bay receives an average of 32 inches of rain per year. The average tidal wave is about 1.1 feet high. Water surface currents have a net flow of 12–40 cm/sec to the Northeast, and the prevailing flow of surface waters is shoreward in a Northwest direction.

In 1971, untreated domestic sewage entered the bay through an outfall off Avenida Hostos and through another outfall off Pampanos Road. To comply with the 1970 Clean Water Act improvements were made. A mid-1970s construction realized an outfall 5,000 feet into the Sea. A March 2001 enhancement also brought the one outfall from Avenida Hostos to diffuse much further into the Sea than before, to where bay depths are 1,200 feet. The post-improvements study demonstrated conclusively that discharges into the Bay by Autoridad de Acueductos y Alcantarillados did not adversely affect the water quality. Also, in 2017, a Biological Evaluation of the area found that sewer discharged into the Bay by the Ponce waste water sewer plants did not adversely affect federally-listed Threatened or Endangered Species or their critical habitats in the Bay.

The primary treated submarine sewage outfall to Bahia de Ponce was relocated to discharge at a depth of 150 m down the insular slope below the pycnocline. The Ponce ocean outfall is 150 meters deep, "all other outfalls discharge within the insular shelf at depths ranging between 15–40 m on the north coast of Puerto Rico."

== Bay wildlife ==
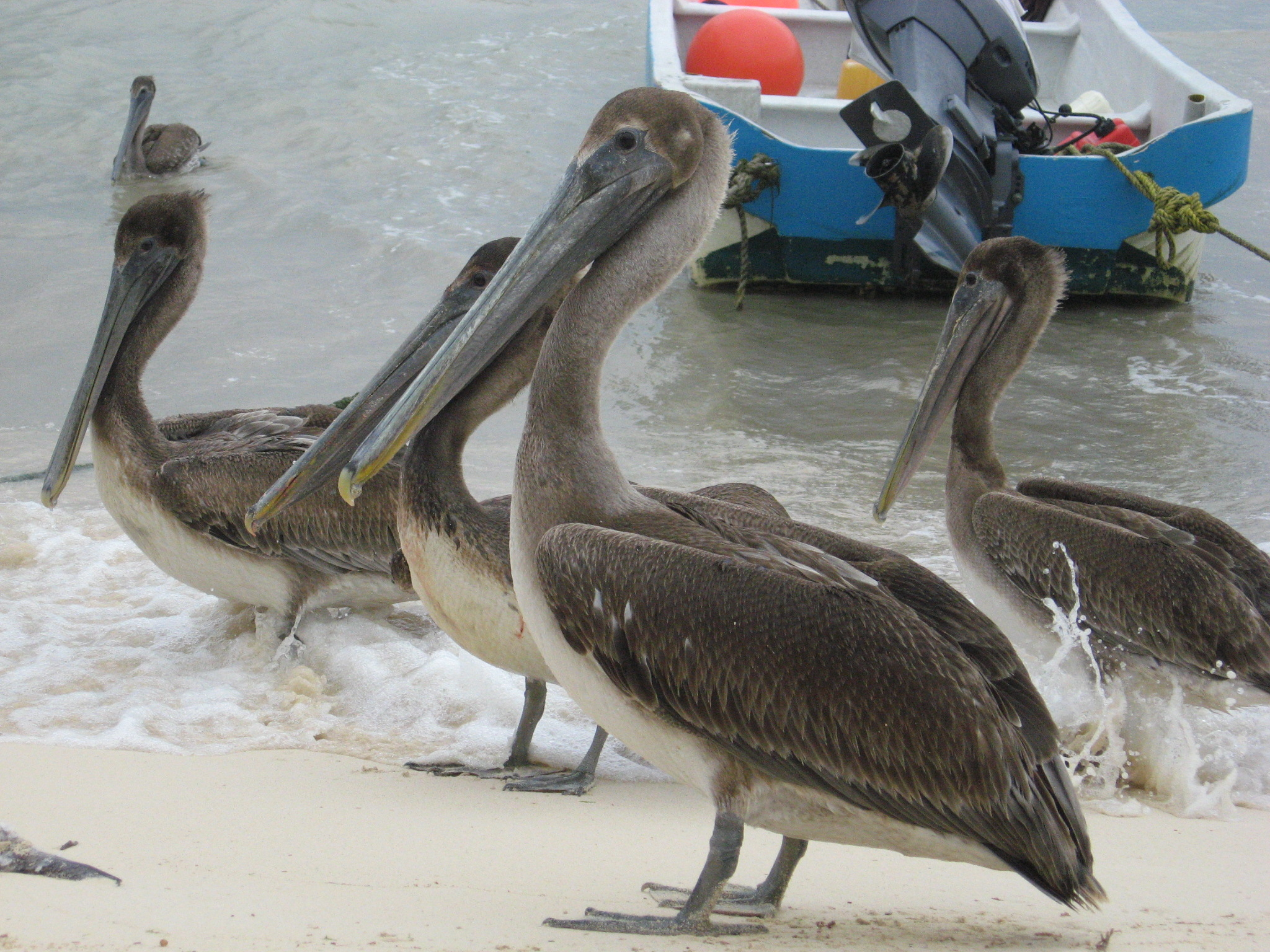
Some of the wildlife present at Bahía de Ponce

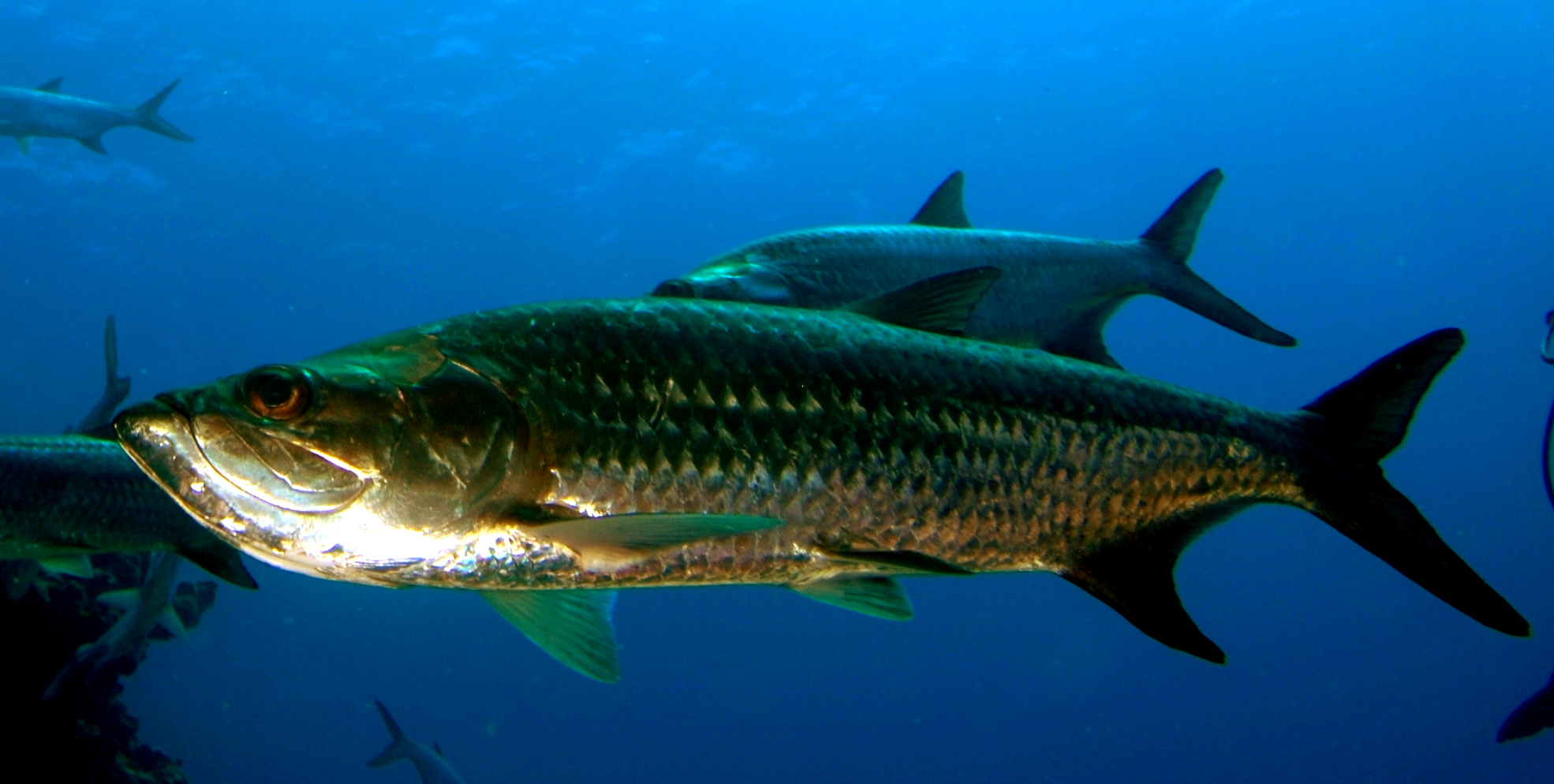
Marine life at Bahía de Ponce

Birds on the bay include the brown pelican, particularly at La Guancha Boardwalk, and seagulls. Among marine species the more visible one is the Atlantic tarpon (Megalops atlanticus), also easily spotted at Paseo Tablado La Guancha. The following are among two endangered species seen in the Bahía de Ponce: the Antillean manatees, which are known to feed in the Bahía de Ponce, with most sightings occurring in the middle part of the Bay, near the Río Matilde estuary, and the brown pelicans, which forage and roost throughout Bahía de Ponce and will casually come onshore at La Guancha Boardwalk in search for food from people strolling by. The brown pelican nests at Isla del Frío just to the east of Bahía de Ponce and roosts at the Punta Cucharas end of the bay. The western sandpiper (Calidris mauri) roosts in the western portion of the bay (Punta Cucharas). Also found in the bay is the roseate tern (Sterna dougallii dougallii), the piping plover (Charadrius melodus), and the Puerto Rican nightjar (Caprimulgus noctitherus). Equally, the blue-winged teal (Anas discors), and the white-cheeked pintail (Anas bahamensis).

These are also at the Punta Cucharas western end of the bay: Puerto Rican oriole (Icterus portoricensis), brown pelican (Pelecanus occidentalis), peregrine falcon (Falco peregrinus), Puerto Rican vireo (Vireo latimeri), and white-cheeked pintail (Anas bahamensis).

Marine life at the bay includes: coney (Epinephelus fulvus), red hind (Epinephelus guttatus), Nassau grouper (Epinephelus striatus), mutton snapper (Lutjanus analis), schoolmaster snapper (Lutjanus apodus), gray snapper (Lutjanus griseus), silk snapper (Lutjanus vivanus), yellowtail snapper (Ocyurus chrysurus), white grunt (Haemulon plumierii), banded butterflyfish (Chaetodon striatus), queen triggerfish (Balistes vetula), squirrelfish (Holocentrus ascensionis), sand tilefish (Malacanthus plumieri), redtail parrotfish (Sparisoma chrysopterum), trunkfish (Lactophrys quadricomis), spiny lobster (Panulirus argus), and queen conch (Strombus gigas).

== Maritime services ==
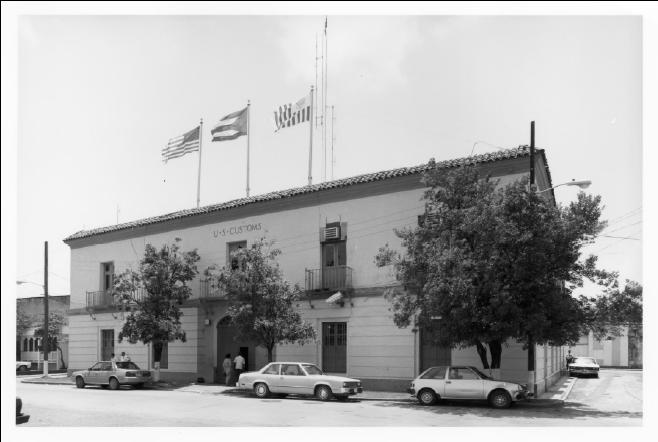
The 1842 Spanish Government Customs House at Bahia de Ponce, became the U.S. Customs House after the 1898 American invasion

The Port of Ponce facilities are in the east portion of the bay, on Punta Peñoncillo. The Port of the Americas has a man-made depth of 50 feet, making it the deepest in the Caribbean. Port facilities include two post-Panamax cranes.

Government services on the Bay include the Ponce Customs House and the U.S. Coast Guard. The U.S. Coast Guard is located at the former Spanish Capitania del Puerto building in Barrio Playa. There is also a precinct of the Policia Municipal de Ponce and the Maritime Unit of the Policia de Puerto Rico there. These are in addition to the Puerto Rico Ports Authority.

The usual anchorage is northeast of Isla de Cardona in depths of 30 to 50 feet, but vessels can also anchor in 30 to 40 feet depths northwest of Las Hojitas. A small-craft anchorage is located northeast of Las Hojitas in depths of 18 to 28 feet. A well-protected anchorage for small boats in depths of 19 to 30 feet is northeast of the Club Nautico de Ponce yacht club on Isla de Gatas. Bahía de Ponce is not safe as a hurricane anchorage because it is exposed to the South. For this reason, seamen seeking protection from hurricanes oftentimes head to the hurricane-proof anchorages at Bahia de Guayanilla or Bahia de Guanica, located 8 and 16 miles to the west, respectively, or Bahía Jobos, located 28 miles to the east.

== Industrial activities ==
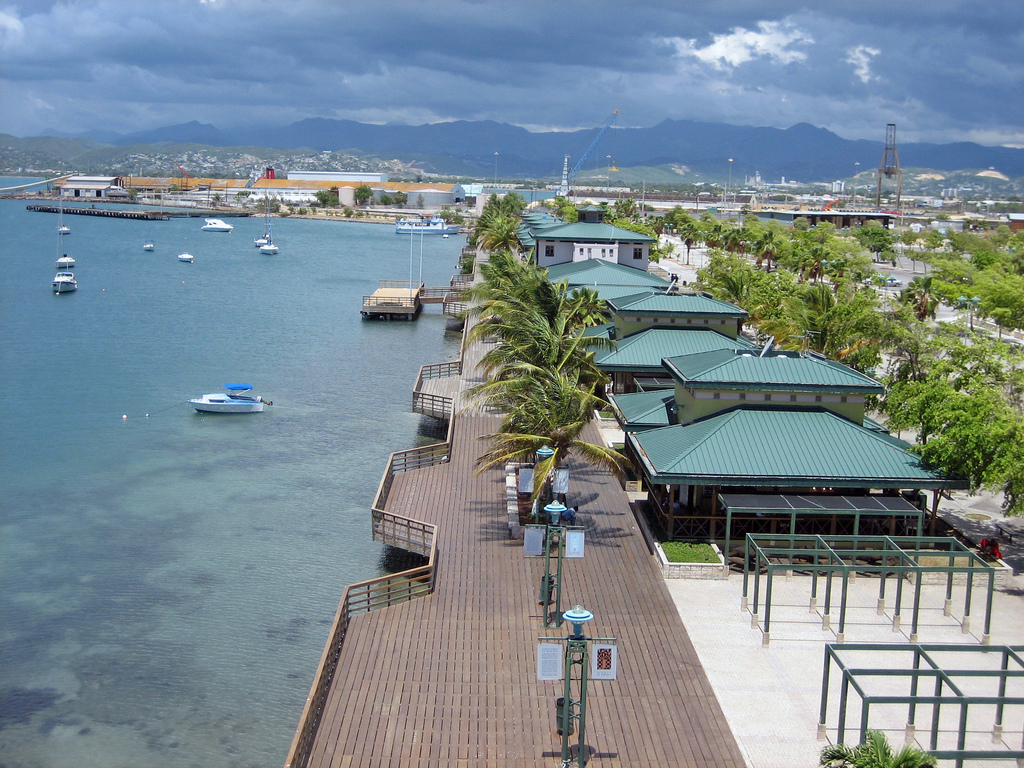
La Guancha Boardwalk, looking west. Port of Ponce warehouses and cranes are visible in the near background.

In addition to the industrial support offered by maritime traffic entering and exiting the Port of Ponce, several industries have settled on or in the vicinity of the Bay. During the 1970s, the Ralston-Purina Tuna Fish Packing Plant operated on the Bay, but has since shut down its operations.

== Recreational activities ==
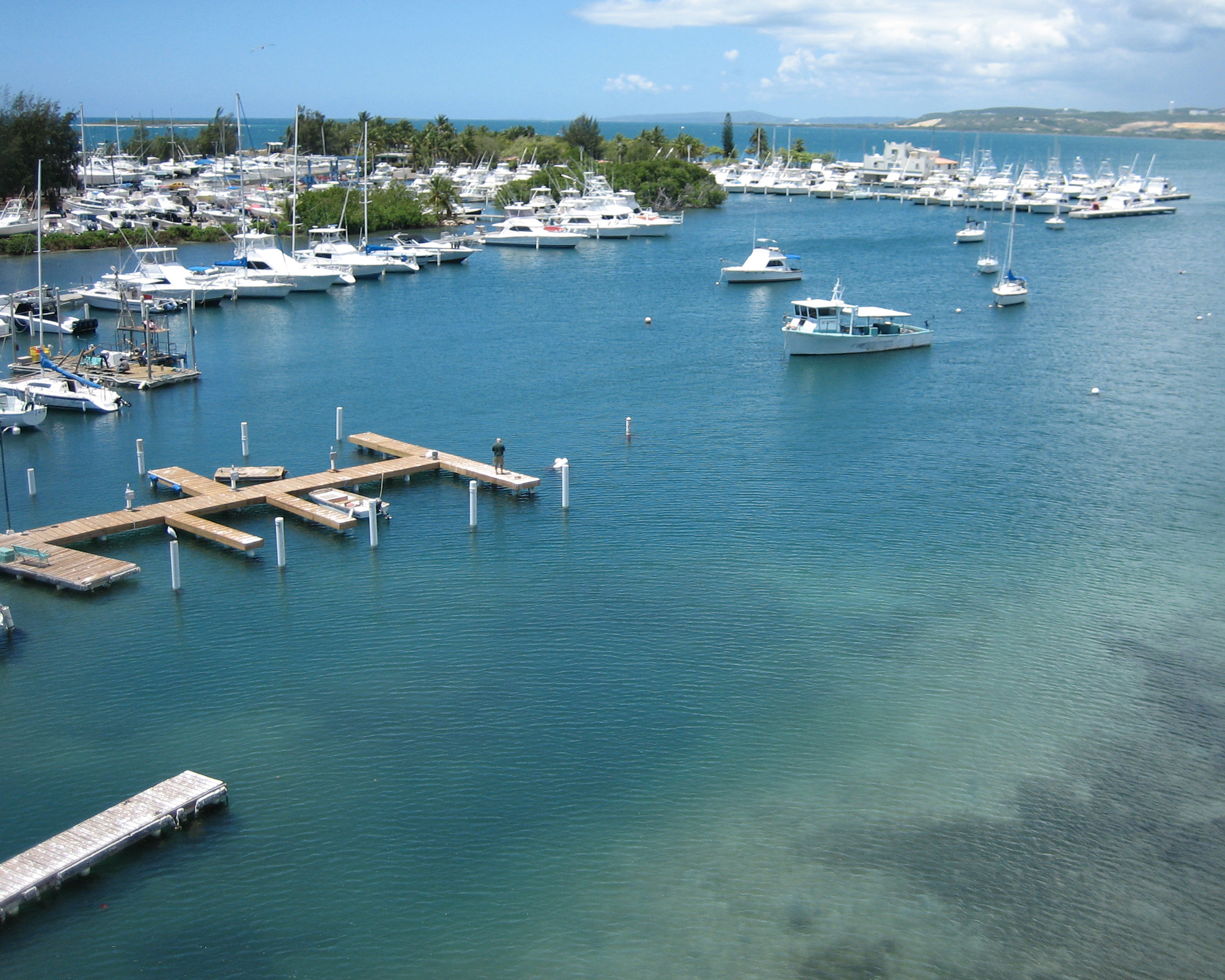
Club Náutico de Ponce at Bahía de Ponce, looking southwest

The bay supports commercial enterprises including recreational fishing. Among recreational activities on the Bay are boats that sail from La Guancha in the bay inlet to Isla Cardona in the middle of the bay with tourists seeking to vacation at Isla Cardona. Isla Cardona is part of the Punta Cucharas Nature Reserve and offers a quiet natural setting where visitors can sun bathe, swim, hike its lighthouse or just relax. Other vessels depart from the bay to ferry visitors to the nearby Caja de Muertos island. Additional recreation can be had at the La Guancha Recreational Complex, as well as the members-only Club Náutico de Ponce. Also, at least two cruise ship lines have scheduled stops at the Port of Ponce.

The annual Cruce a Nado Internacional swimming sports event is held at this Bay every September. Participants are ferried to Isla Cardona from where they swim across the bay to the shore in front of Parque Enrique González park in barrio Playa. The event is carried out in compliance with the standards and requirements of the International Swimming Federation.

== Gallery ==
=== Marine life ===
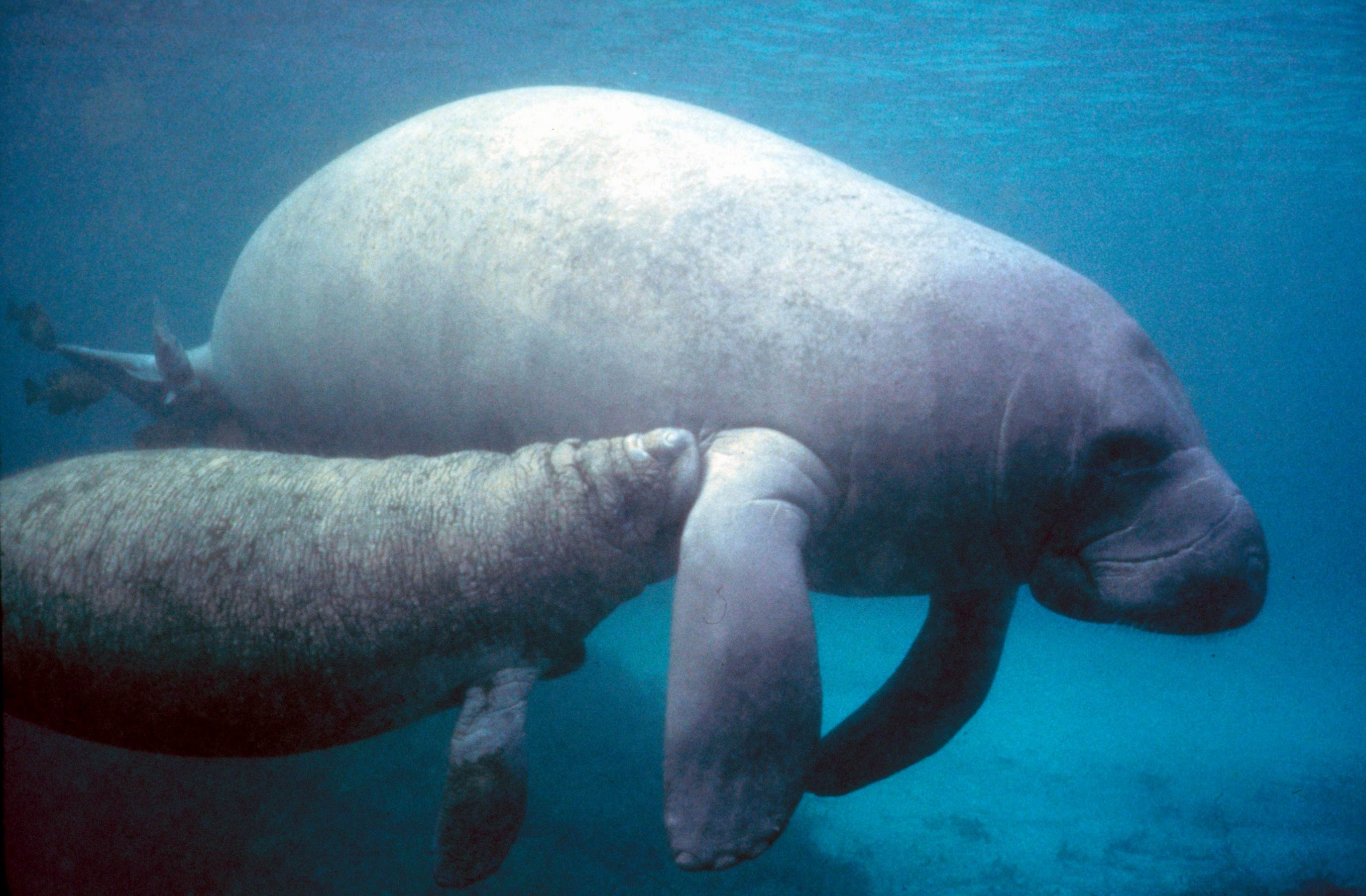
Antillean manatee (Trichechus manatus)

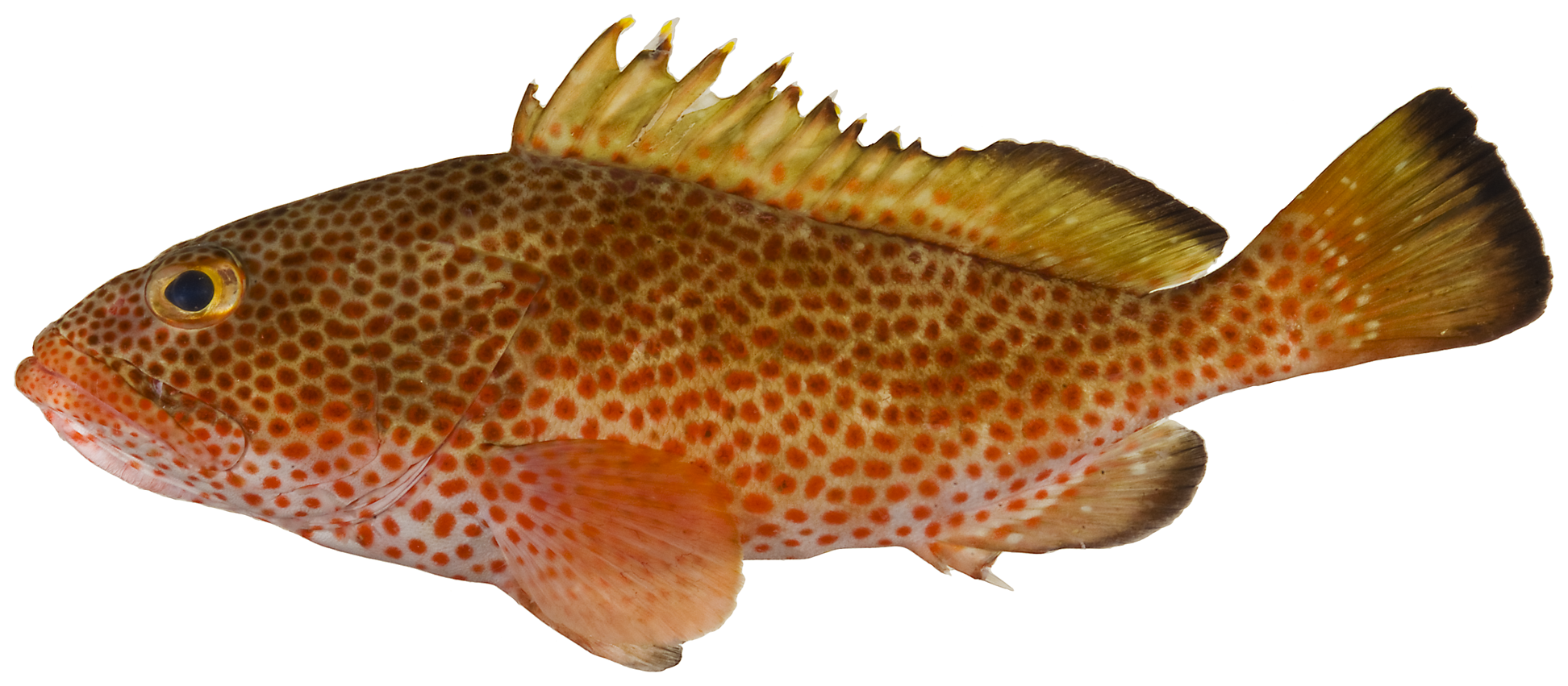
Red hind (Epinephelus guttatus)

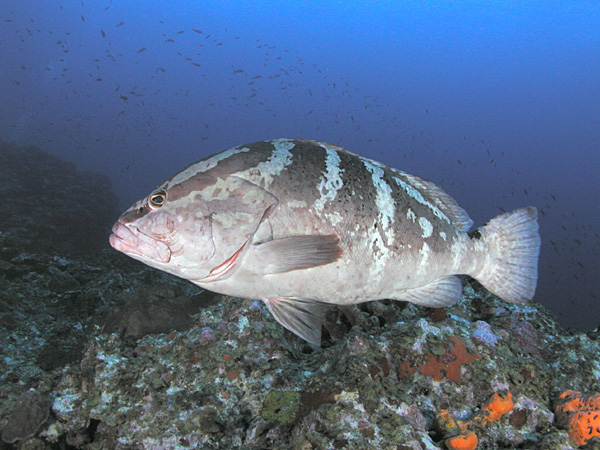
Nassau grouper (Epinephelus striatus)

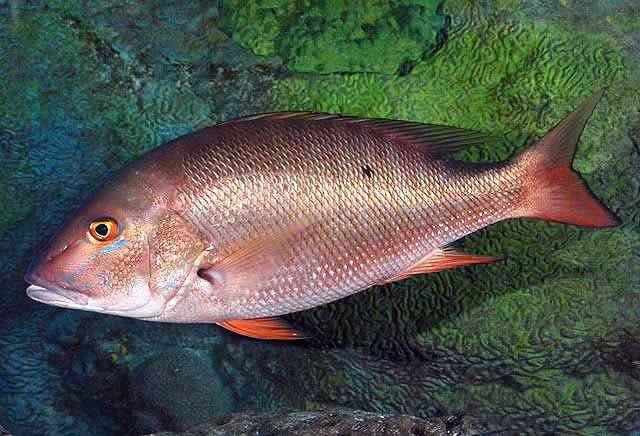
Mutton snapper (Lutjanus analis)

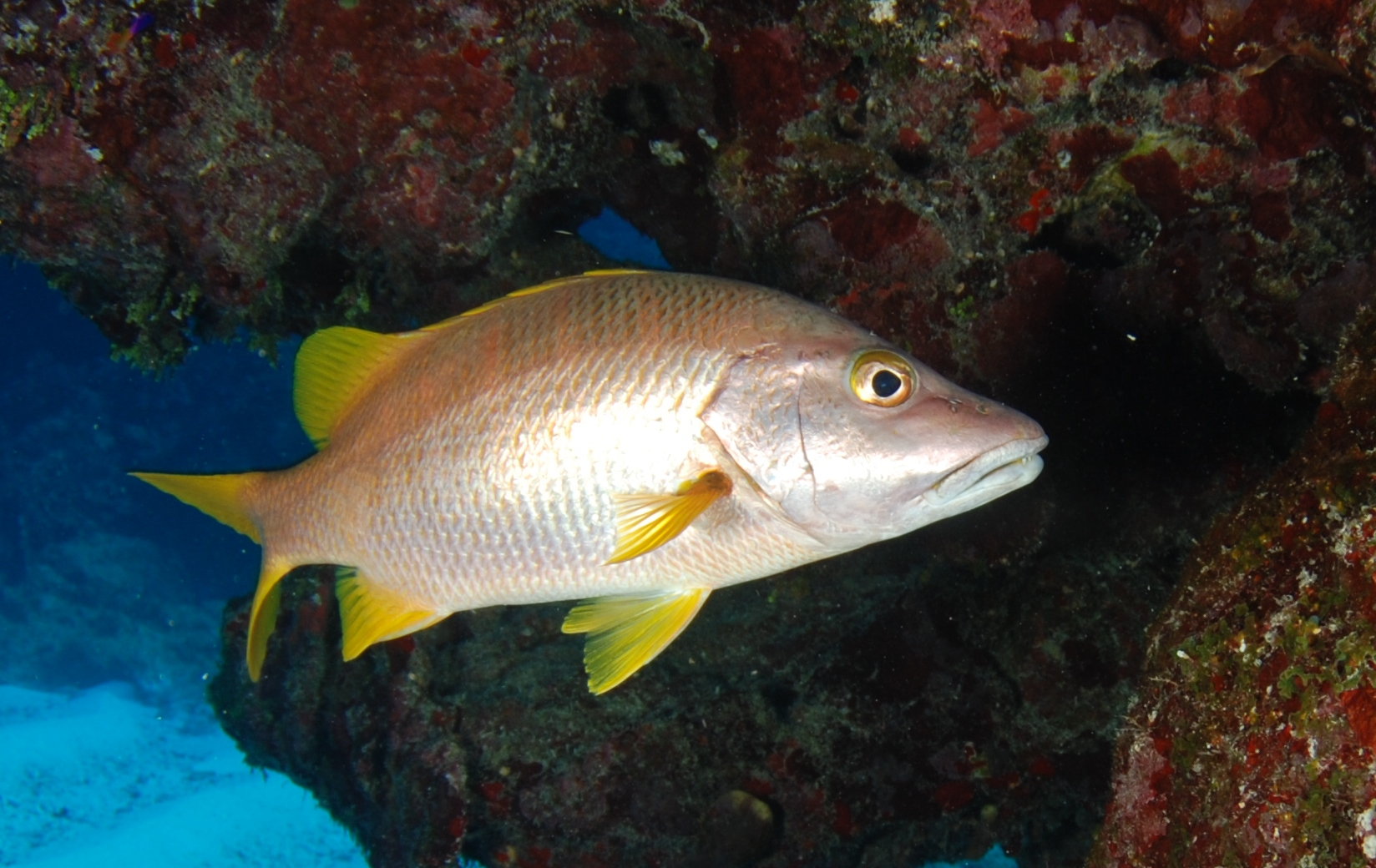
Schoolmaster snapper (Lutjanus apodus)

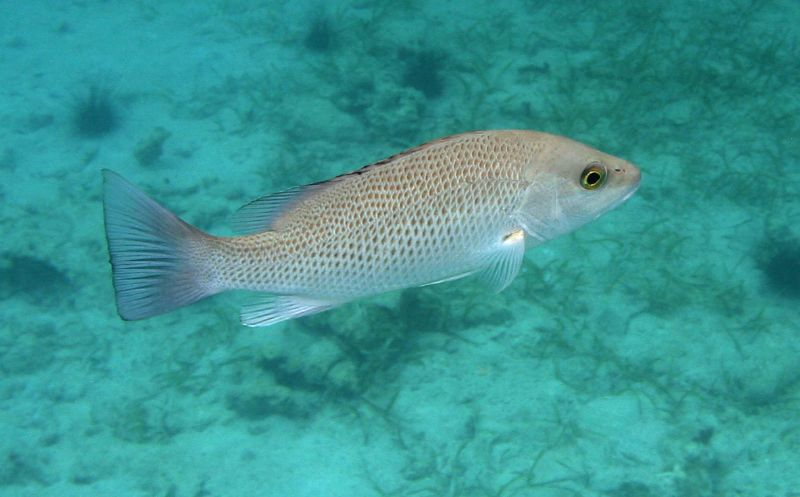
Gray snapper (Lutjanus griseus)

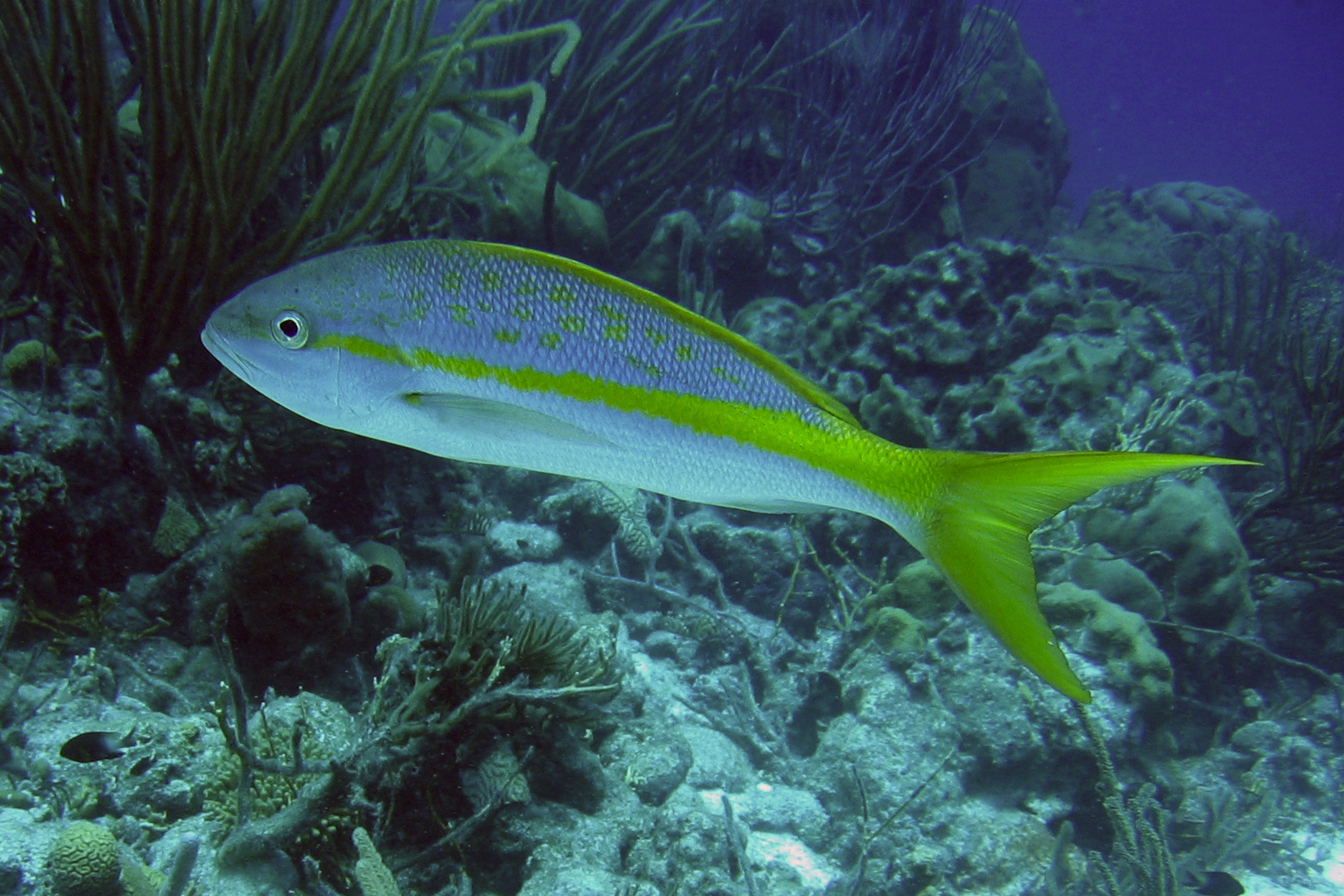
Yellowtail snapper (Ocyurus chrysurus)

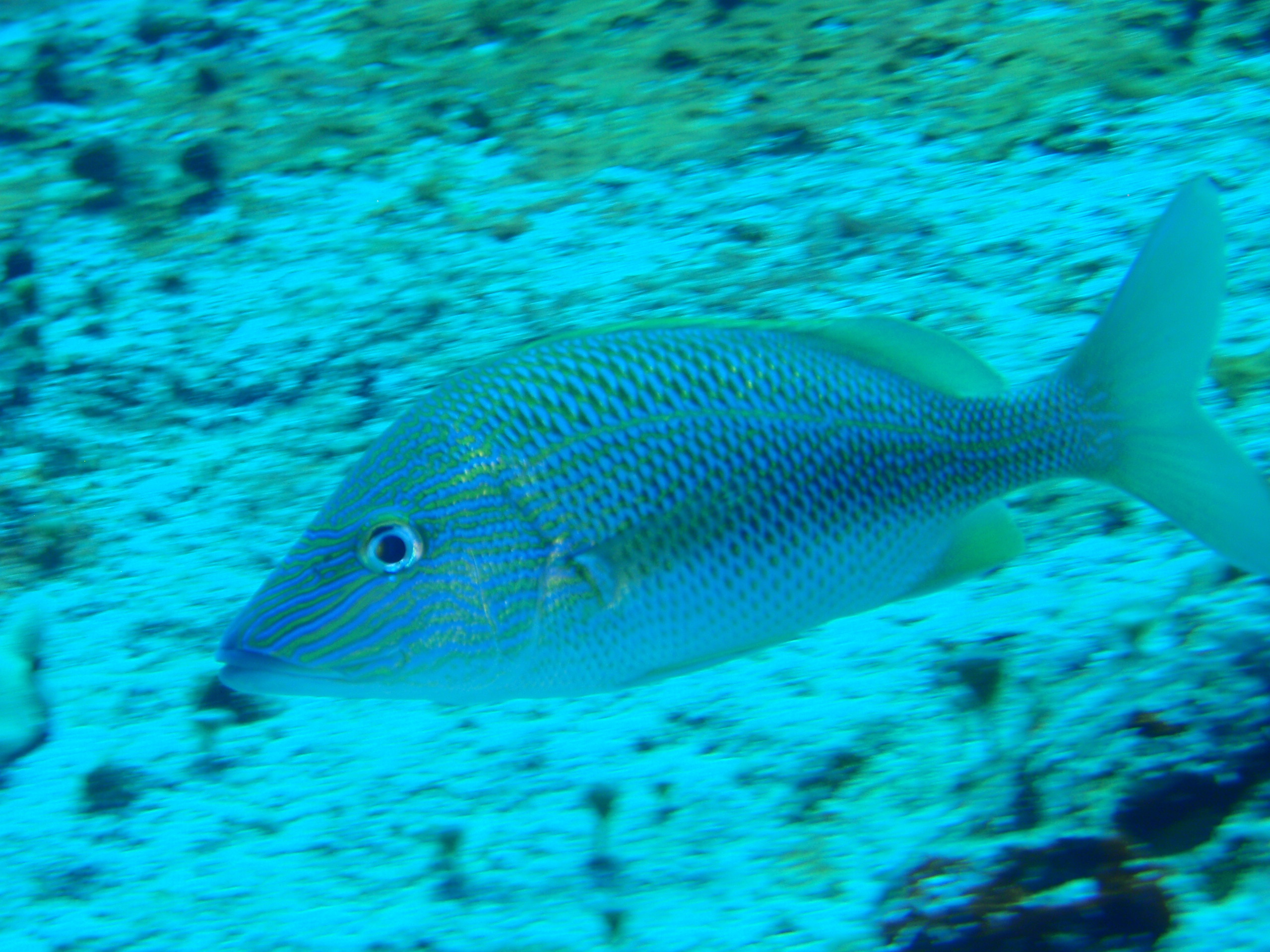
White grunt (Haemulon plumierii)

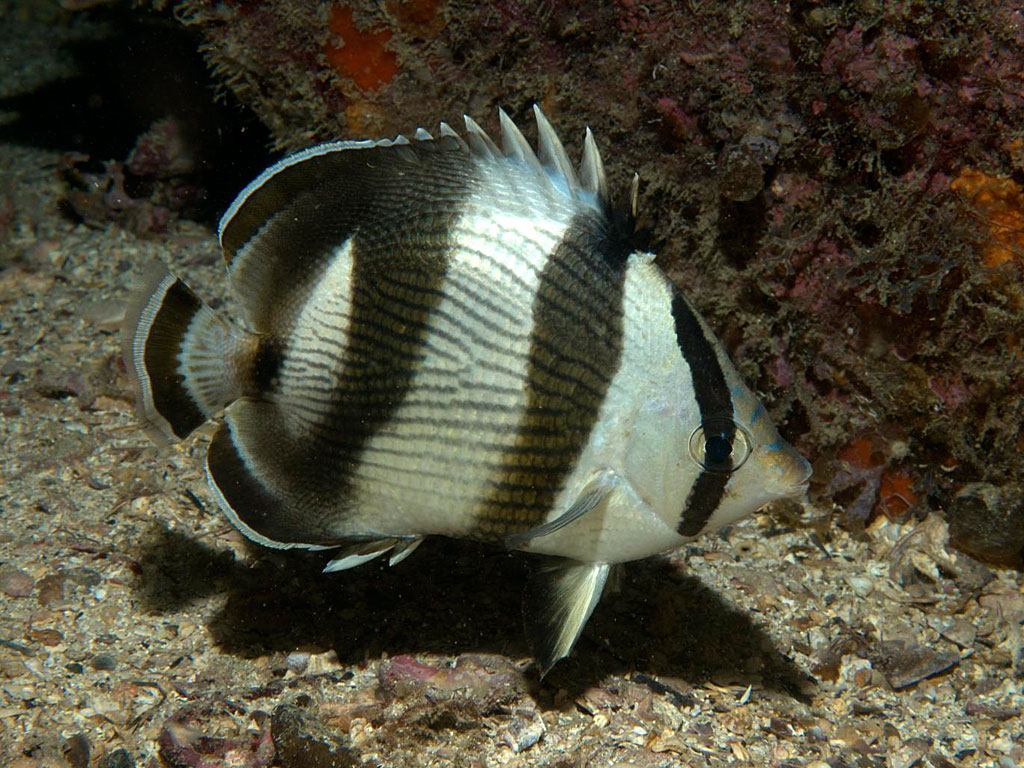
Banded butterflyfish (Chaetodon striatus)

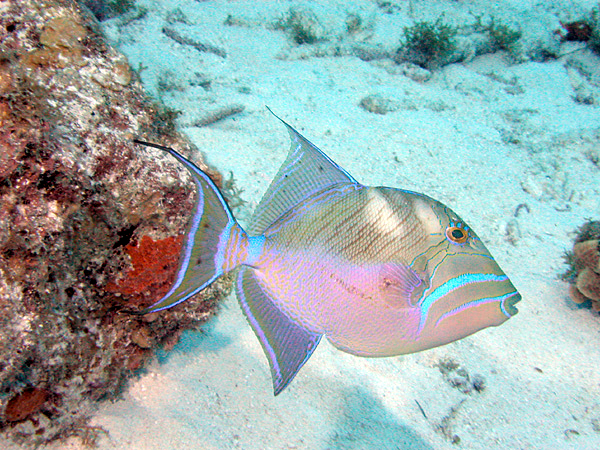
Queen triggerfish (Balistes vetula)

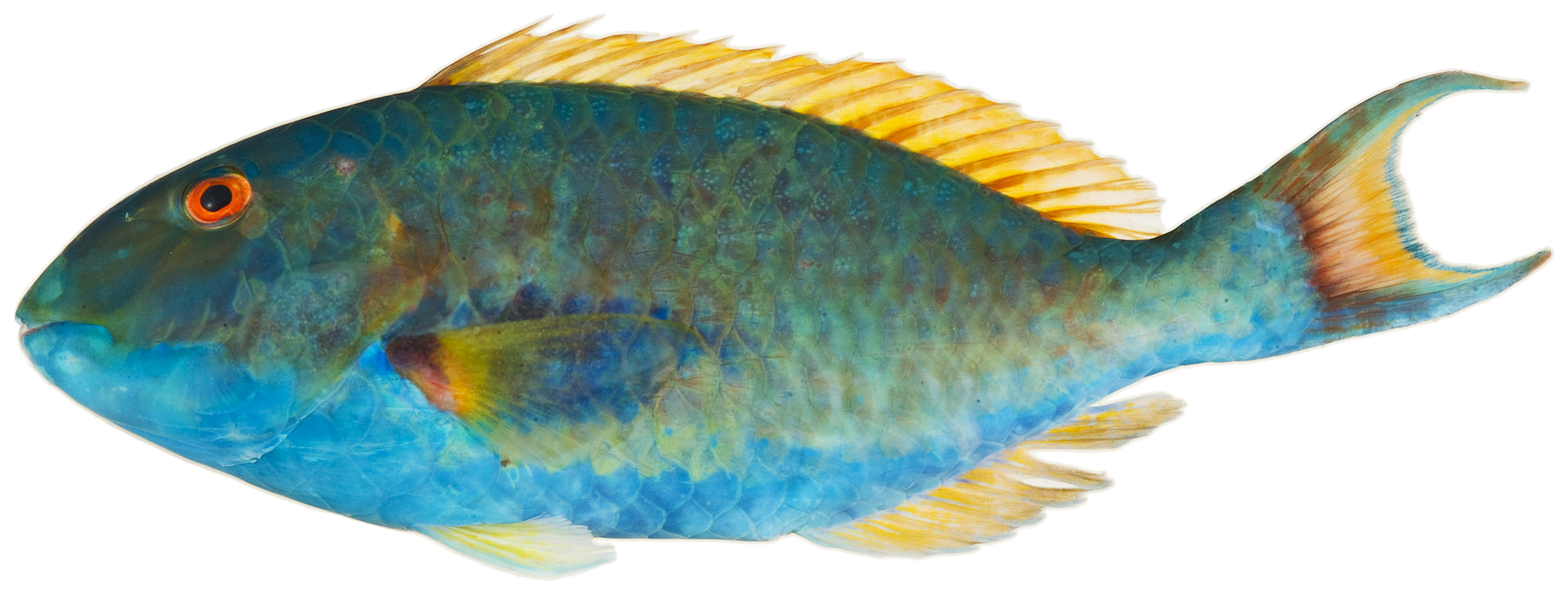
Redtail parrotfish (Sparisoma chrysopterum)

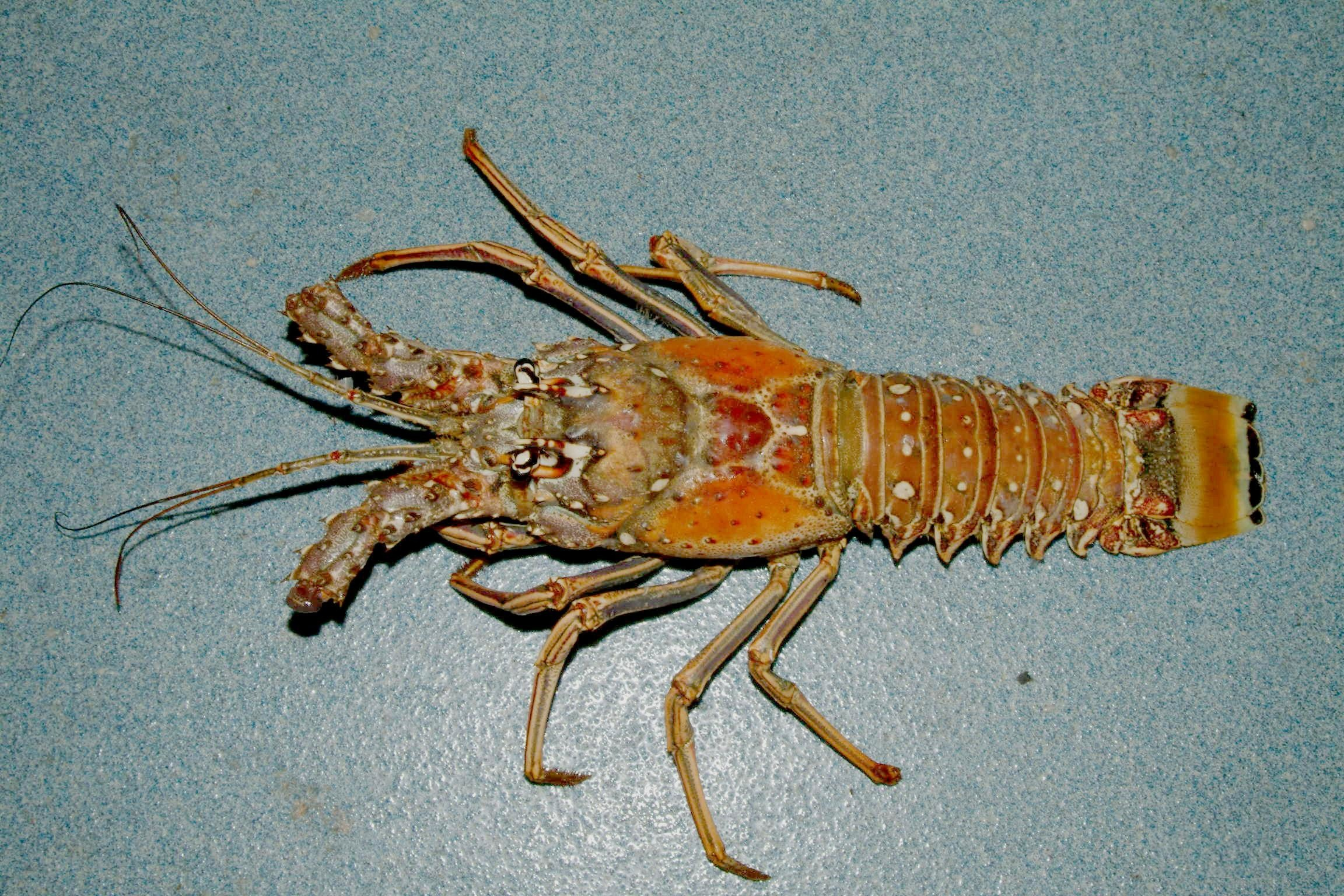
Caribbean spiny lobster (Panulirus argus)

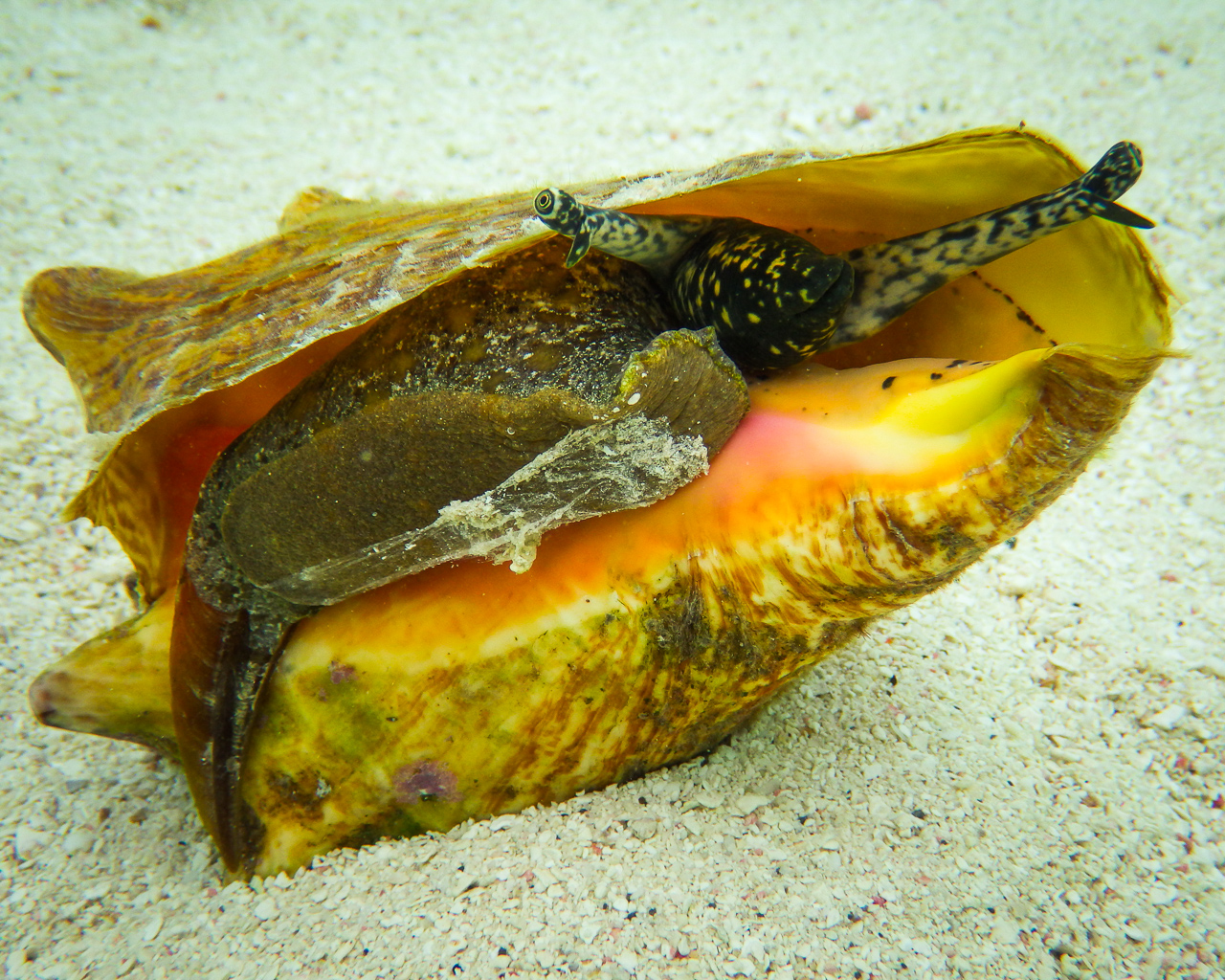
Queen conch (Strombus gigas)

=== Marine birds ===
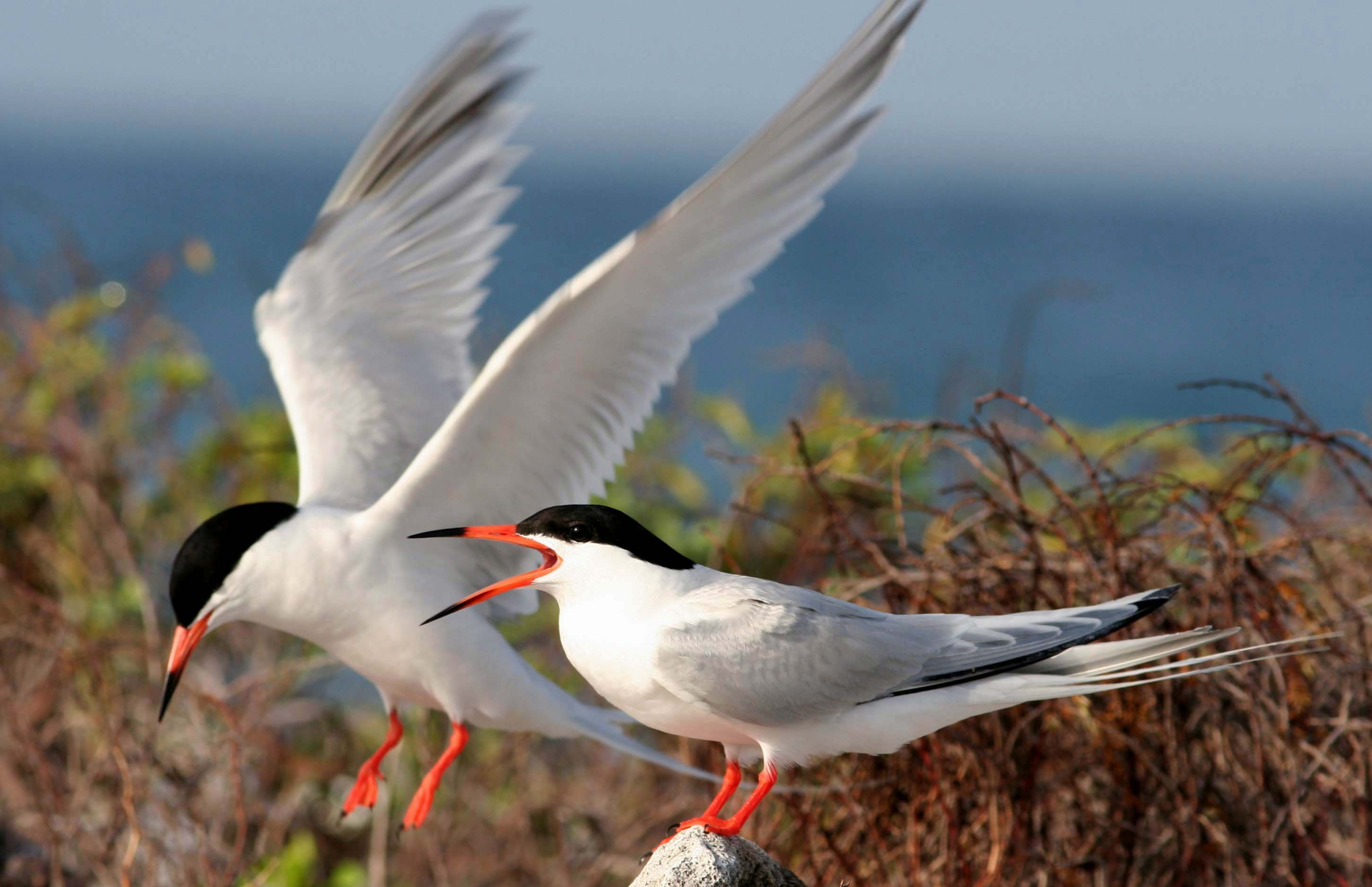
Roseate tern (Sterna dougallii dougallii)

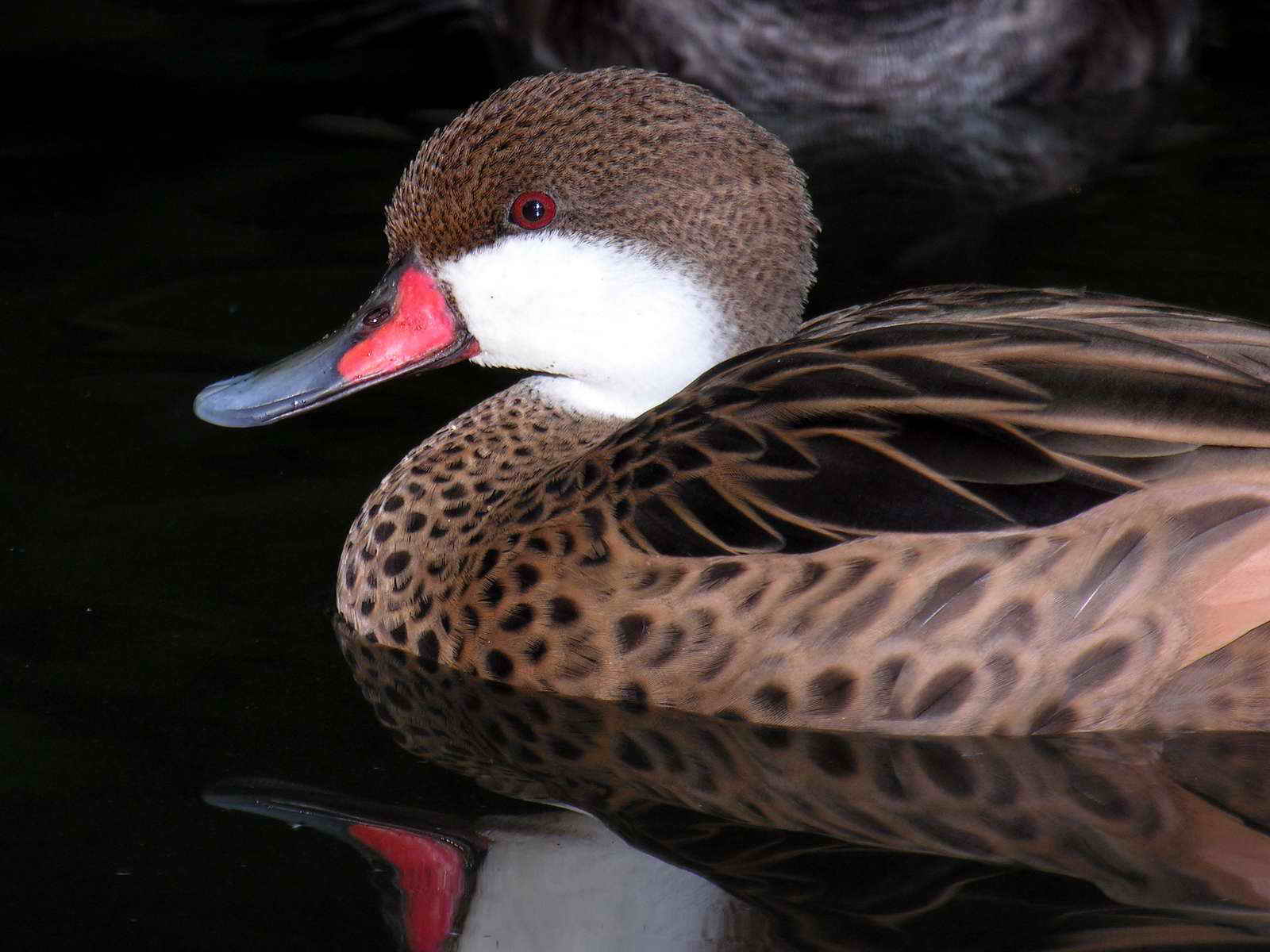
White-cheeked pintail (Anas bahamensis)

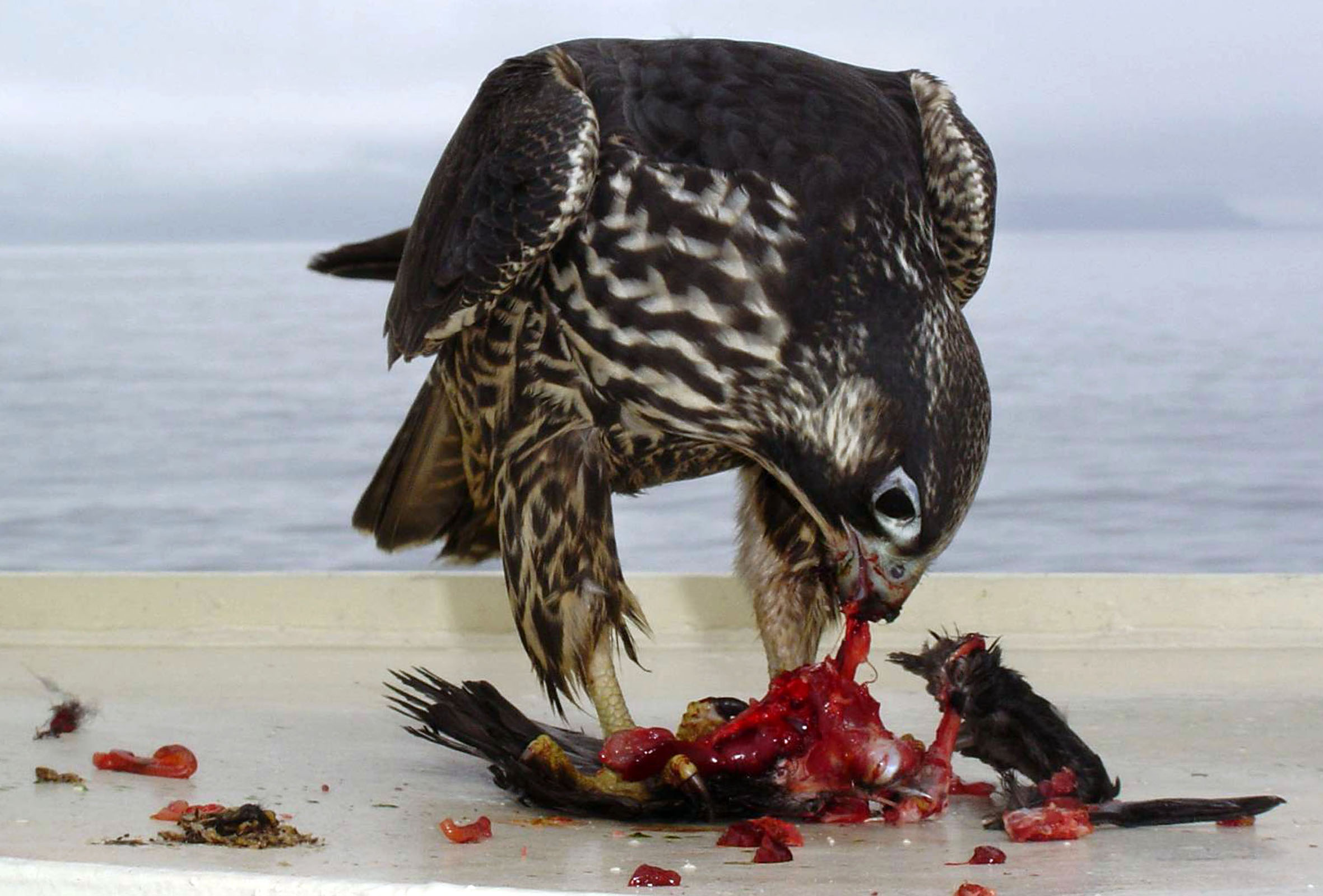
Peregrine falcon (Falco peregrinus)

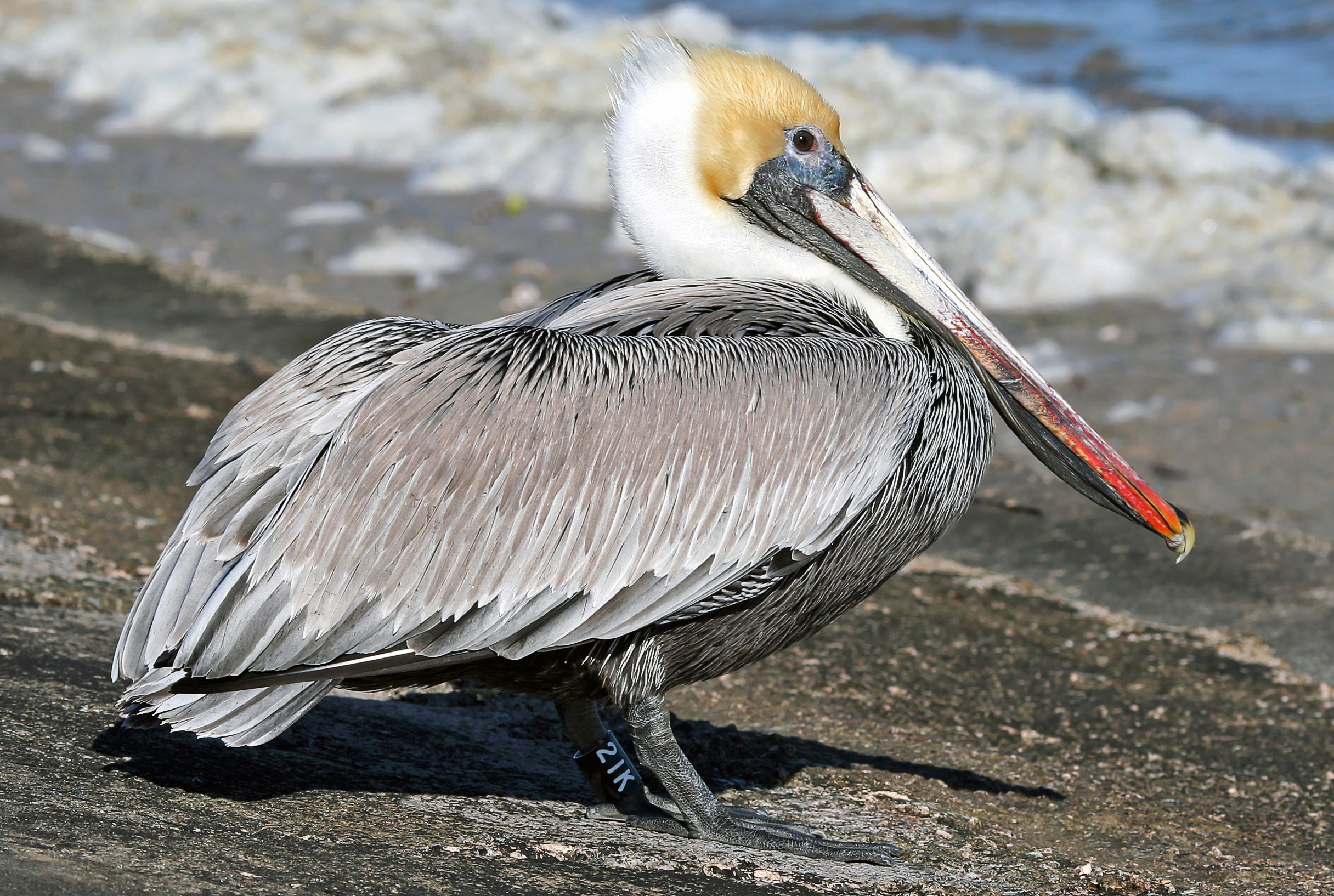
Brown pelican (Pelecanus occidentalis)

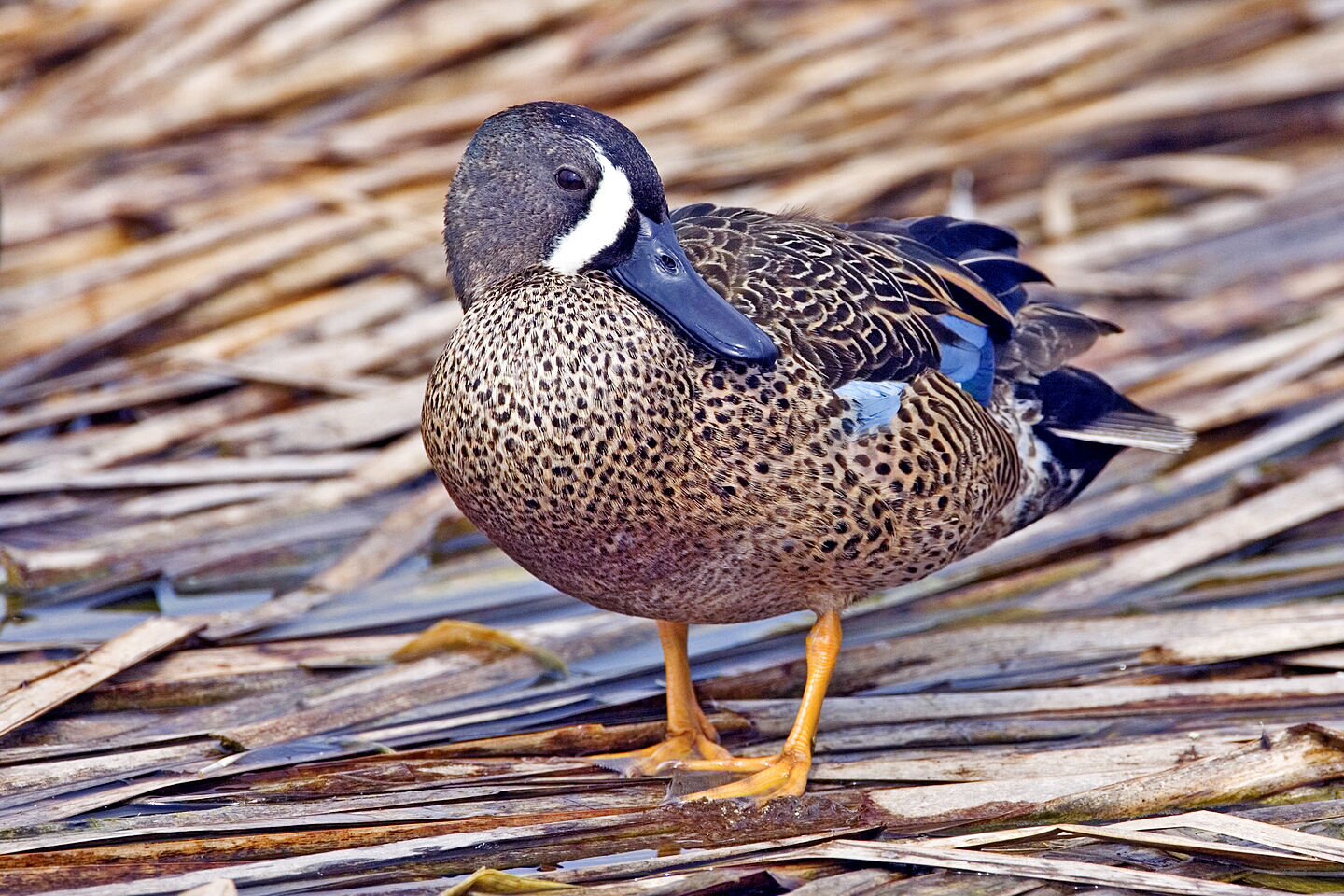
Blue-winged teal (Anas discors)

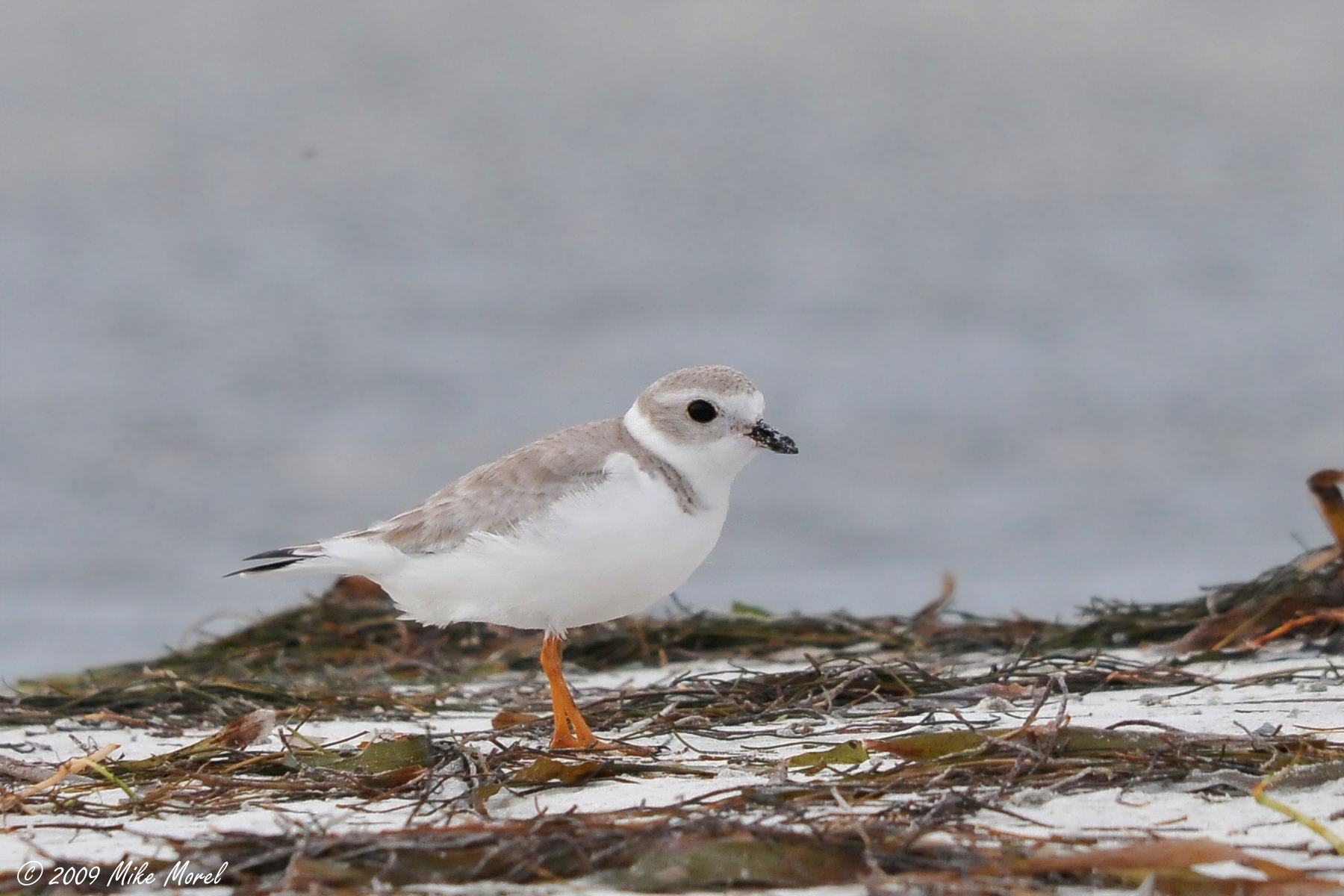
Piping plover (Charadrius melodus)

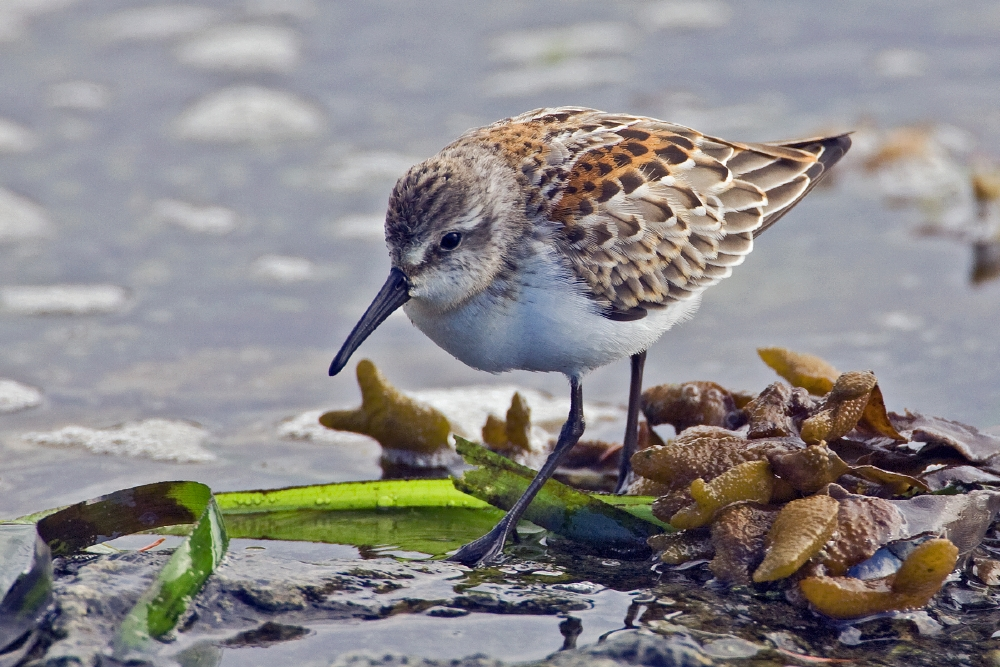
Western sandpiper (Calidris mauri)

=== Maps ===
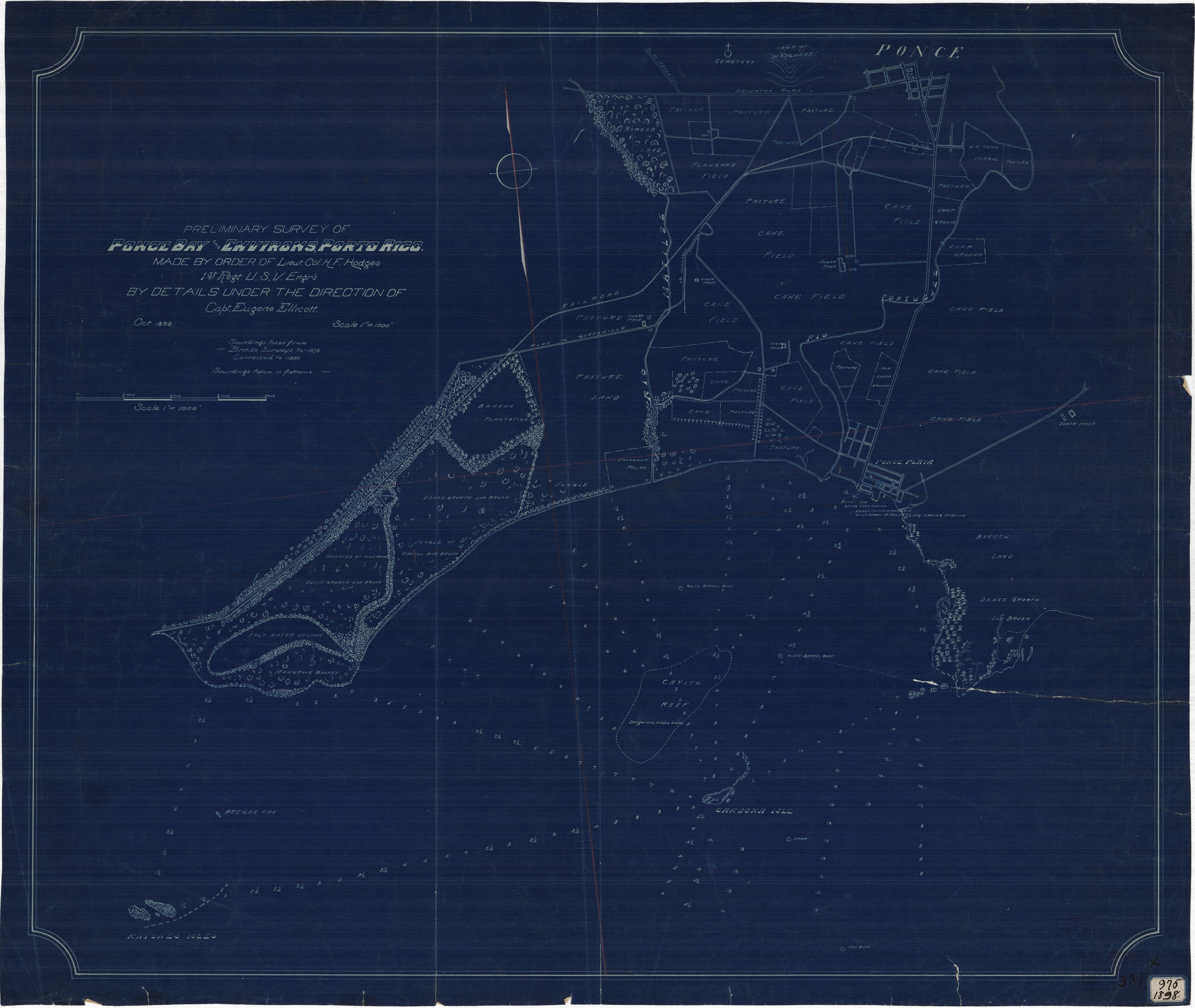
October 1898 map of Bahía de Ponce

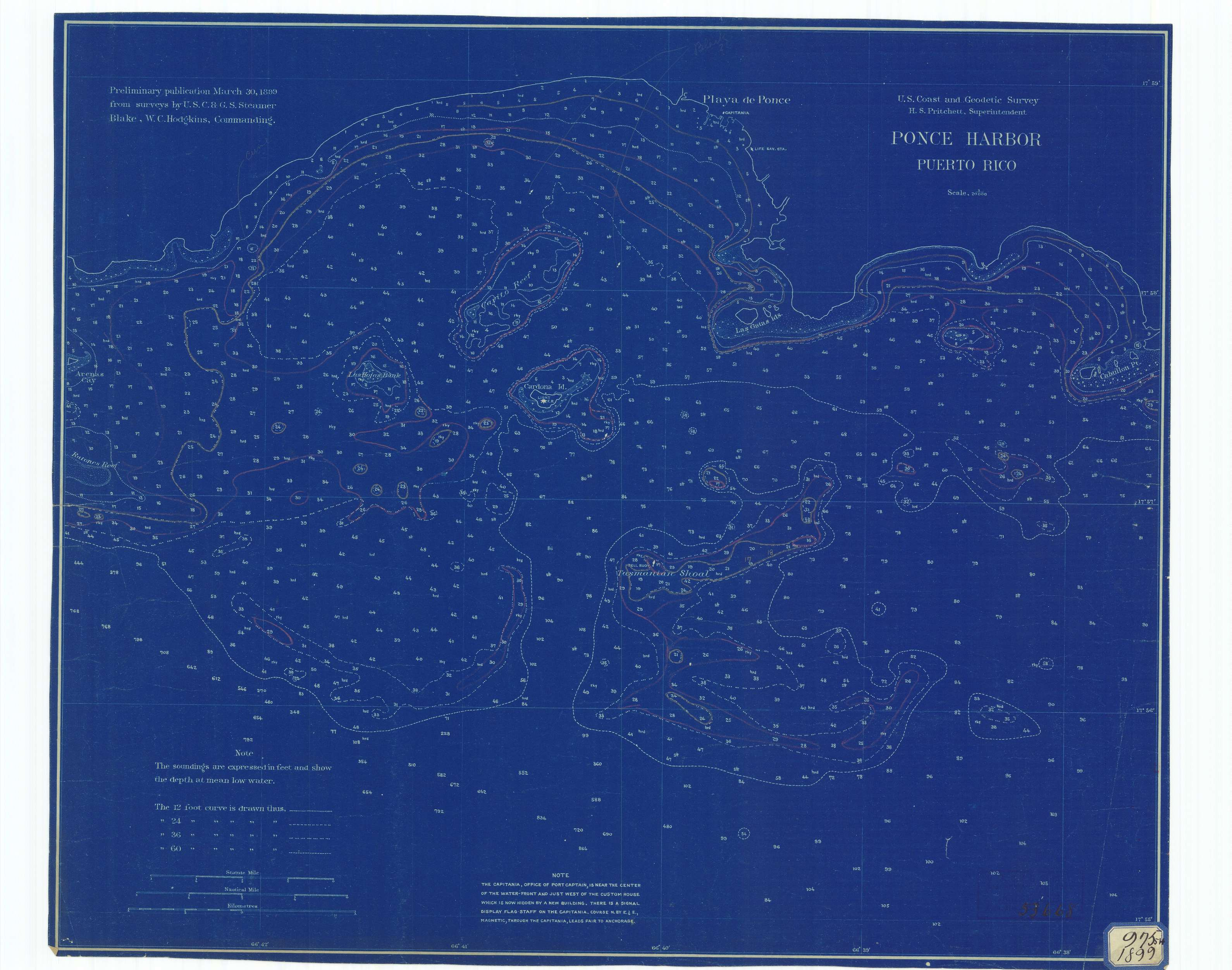
March 1899 map of Bahía de Ponce

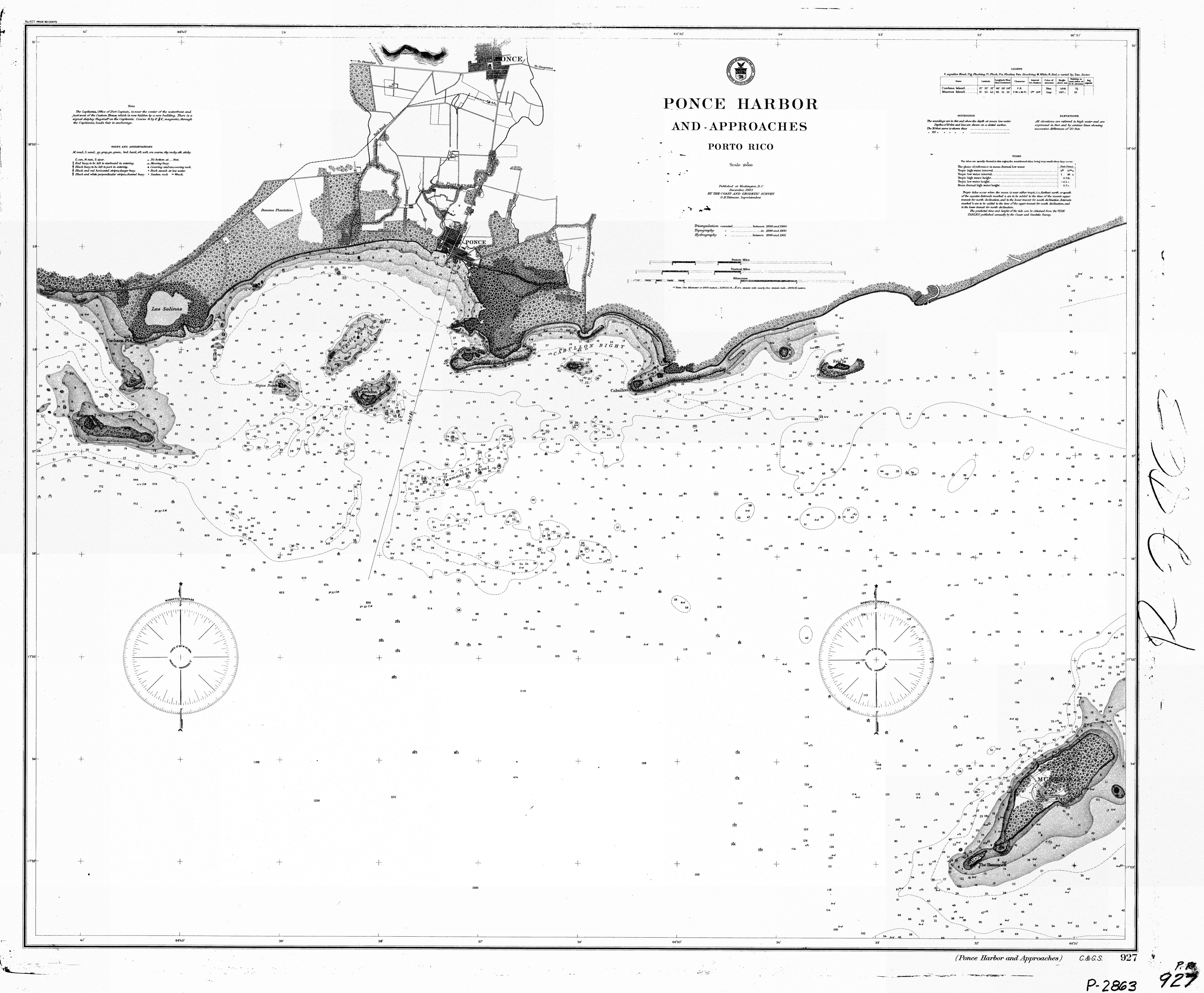
December 1903 map of Bahía de Ponce

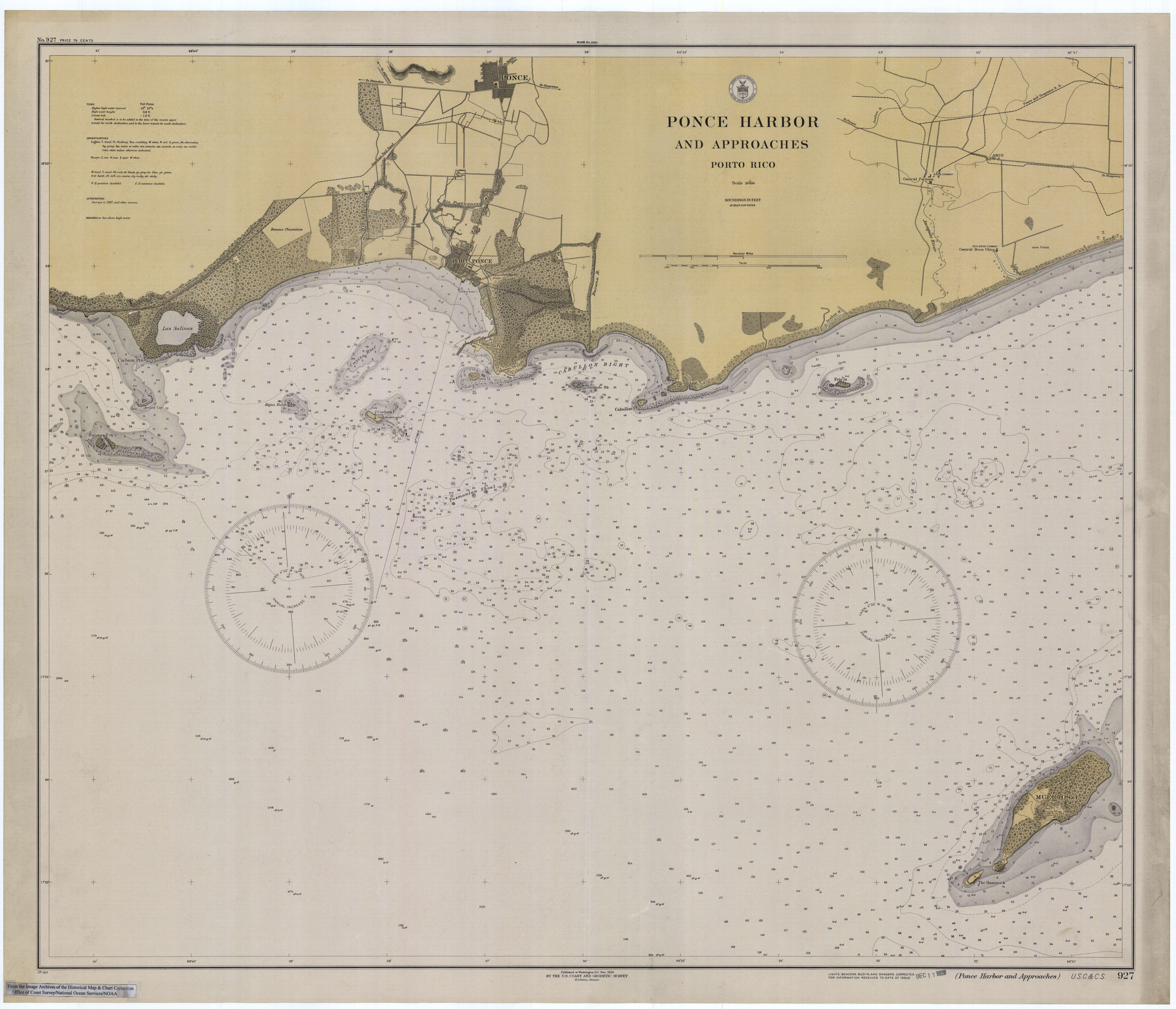
December 1929 map of Bahía de Ponce

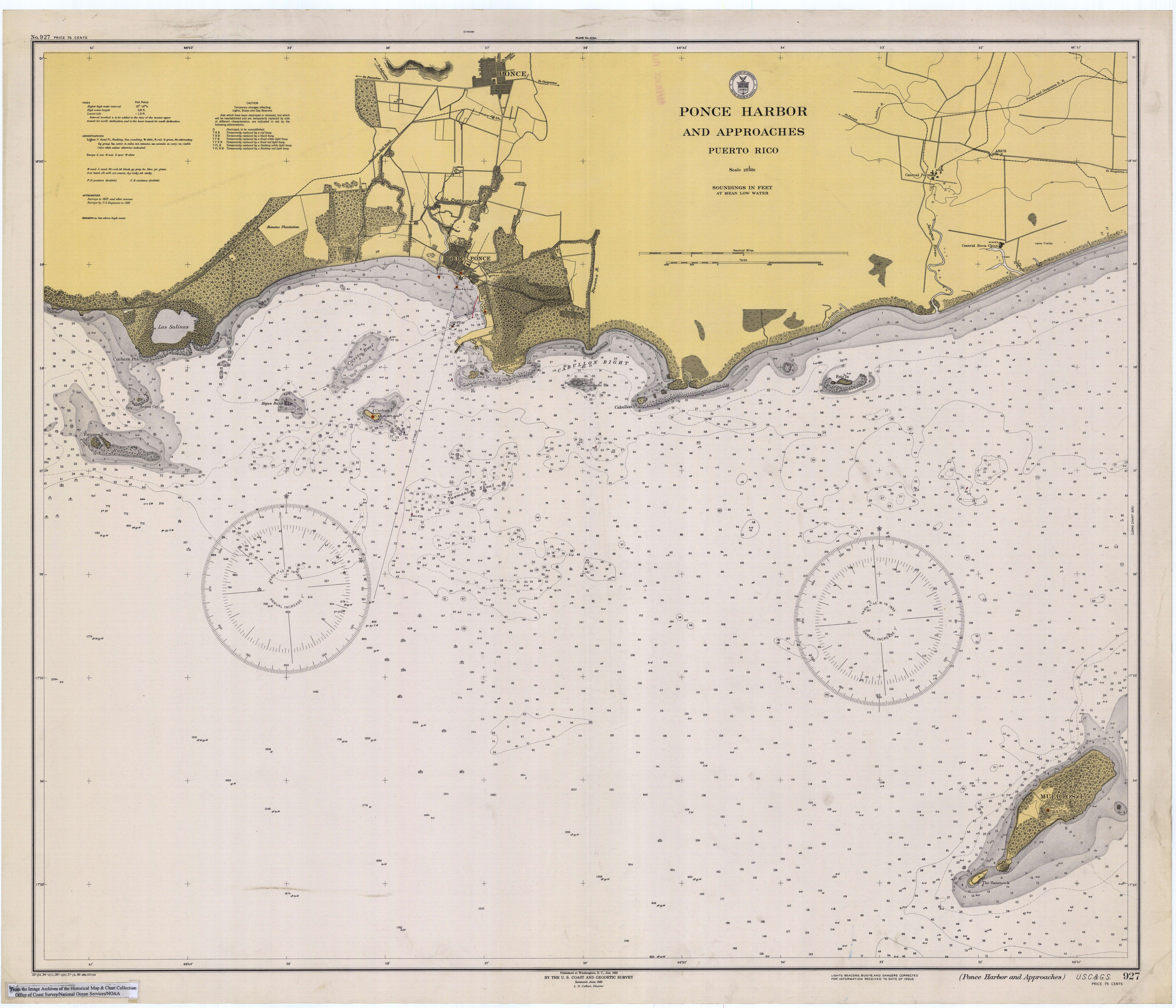
January 1940 map of Bahía de Ponce

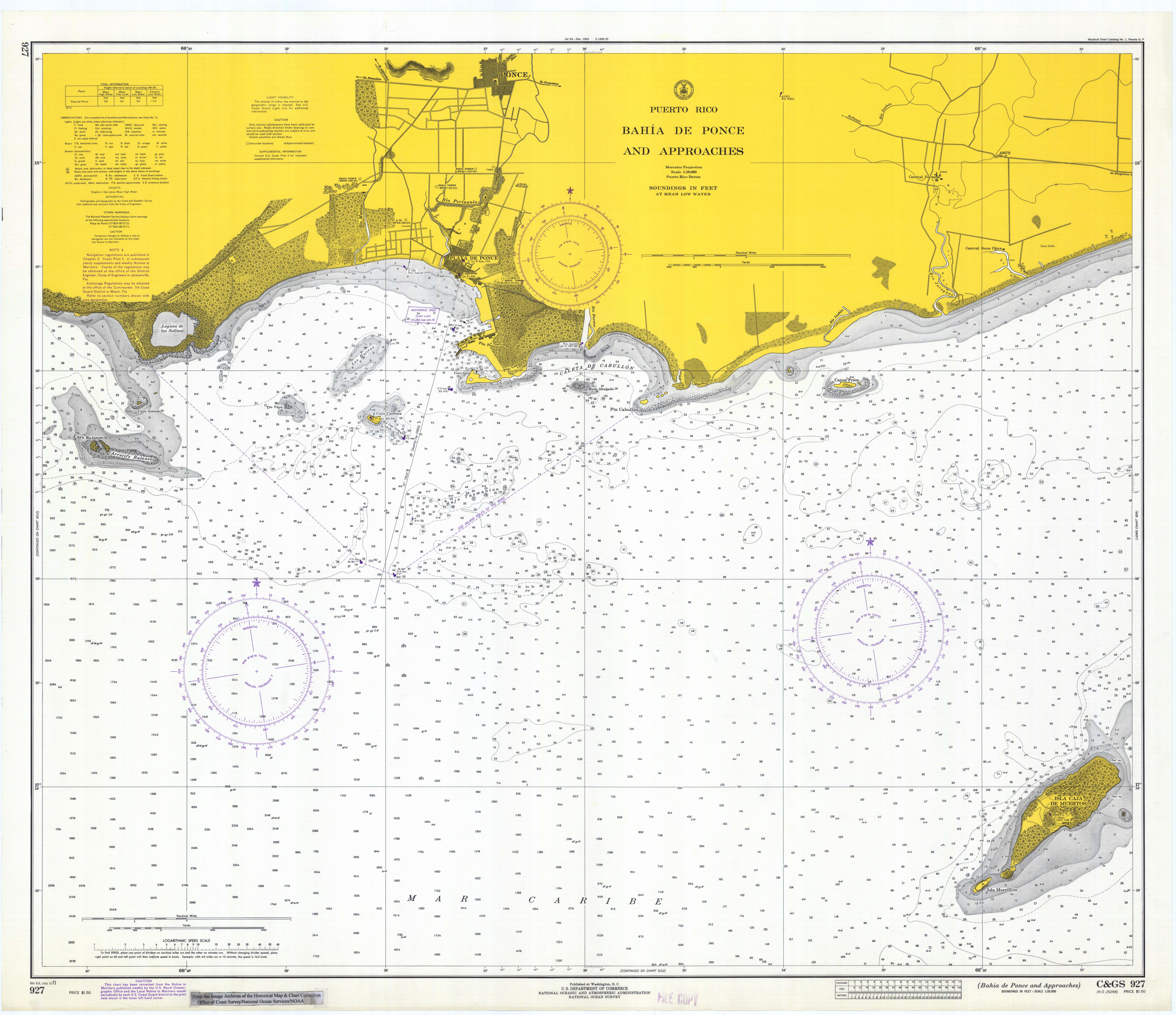
July 1971 map of Bahía de Ponce

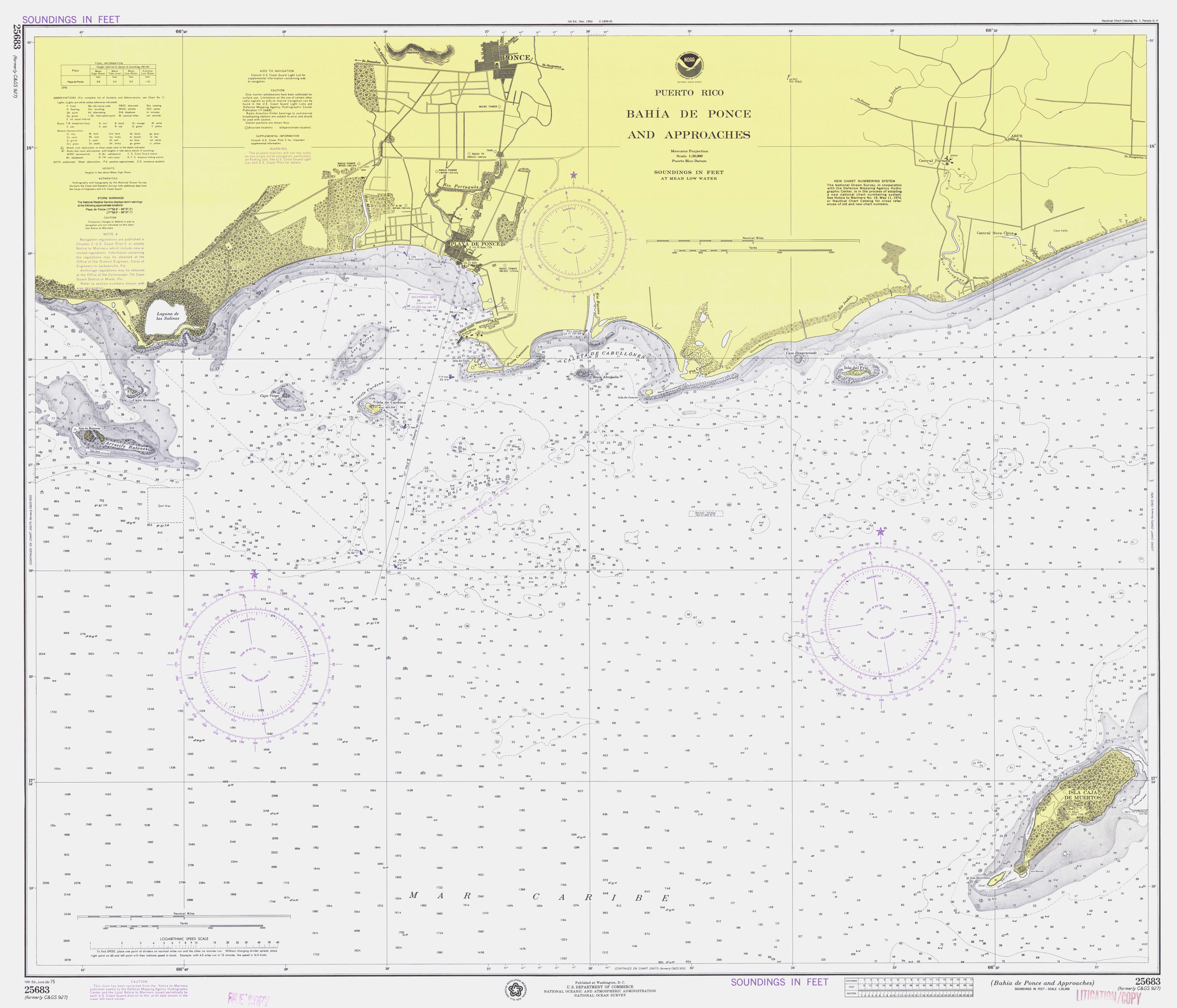
June 1975 map of Bahía de Ponce

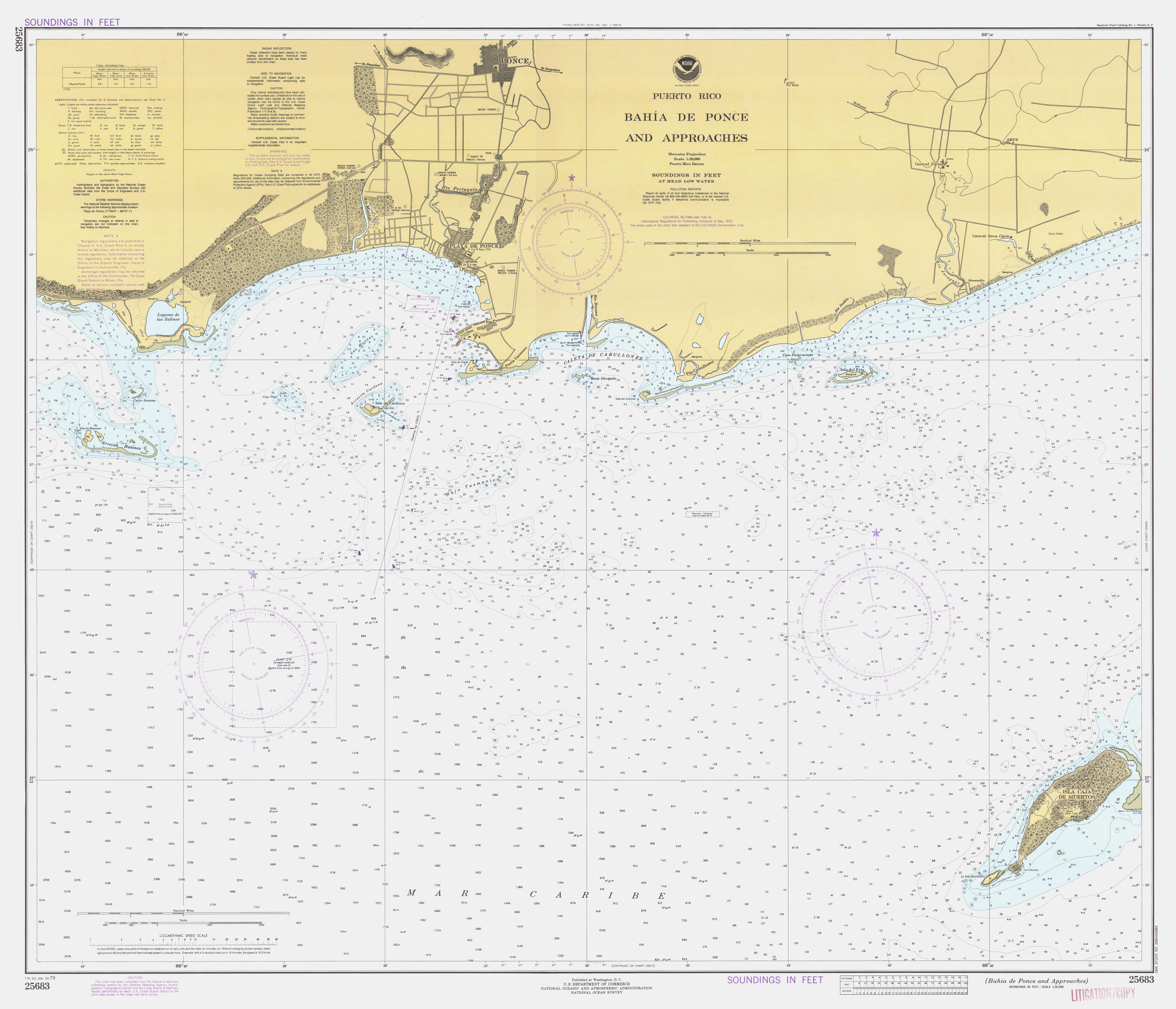
March 1979 map of Bahía de Ponce

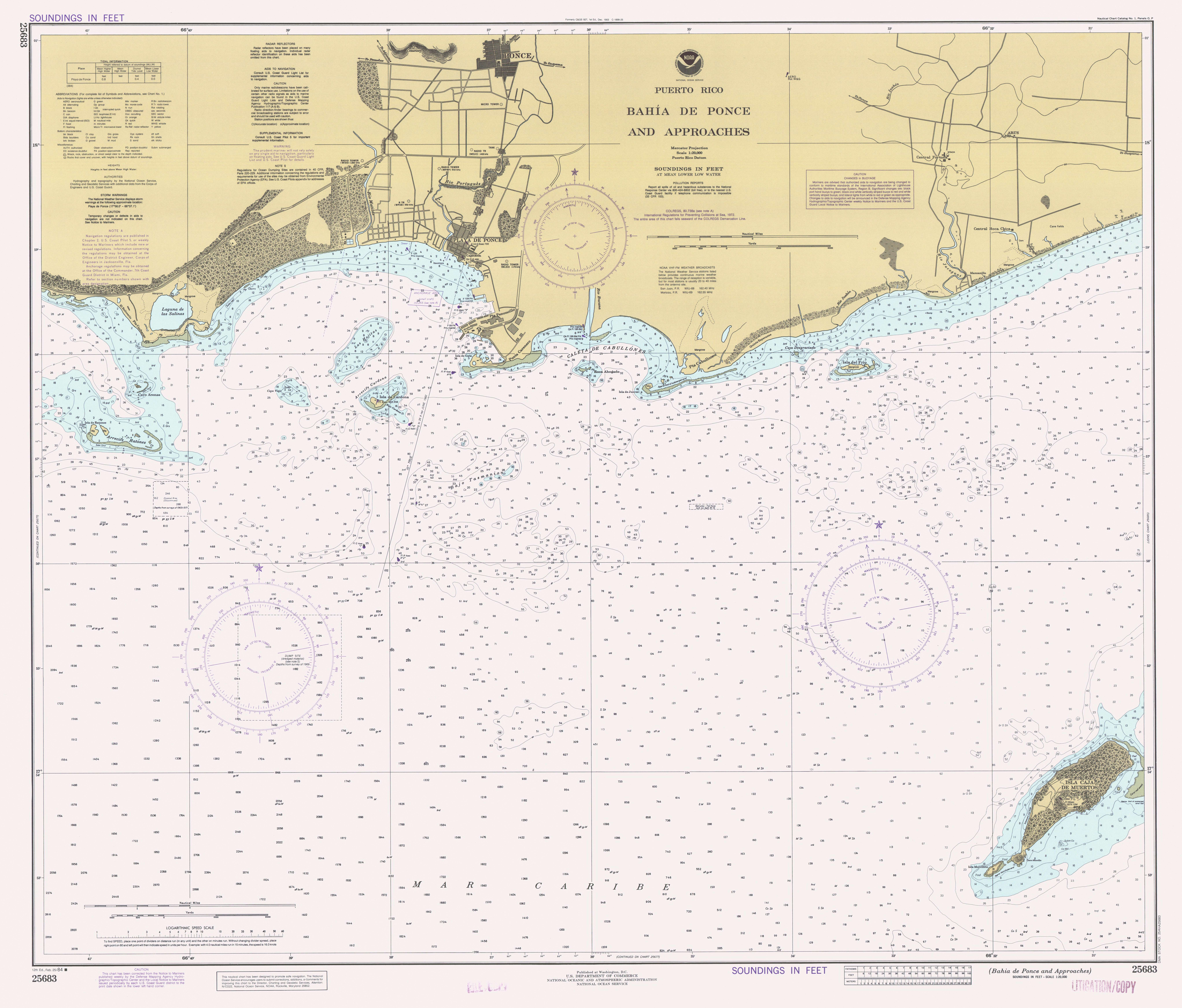
February 1984 map of Bahía de Ponce

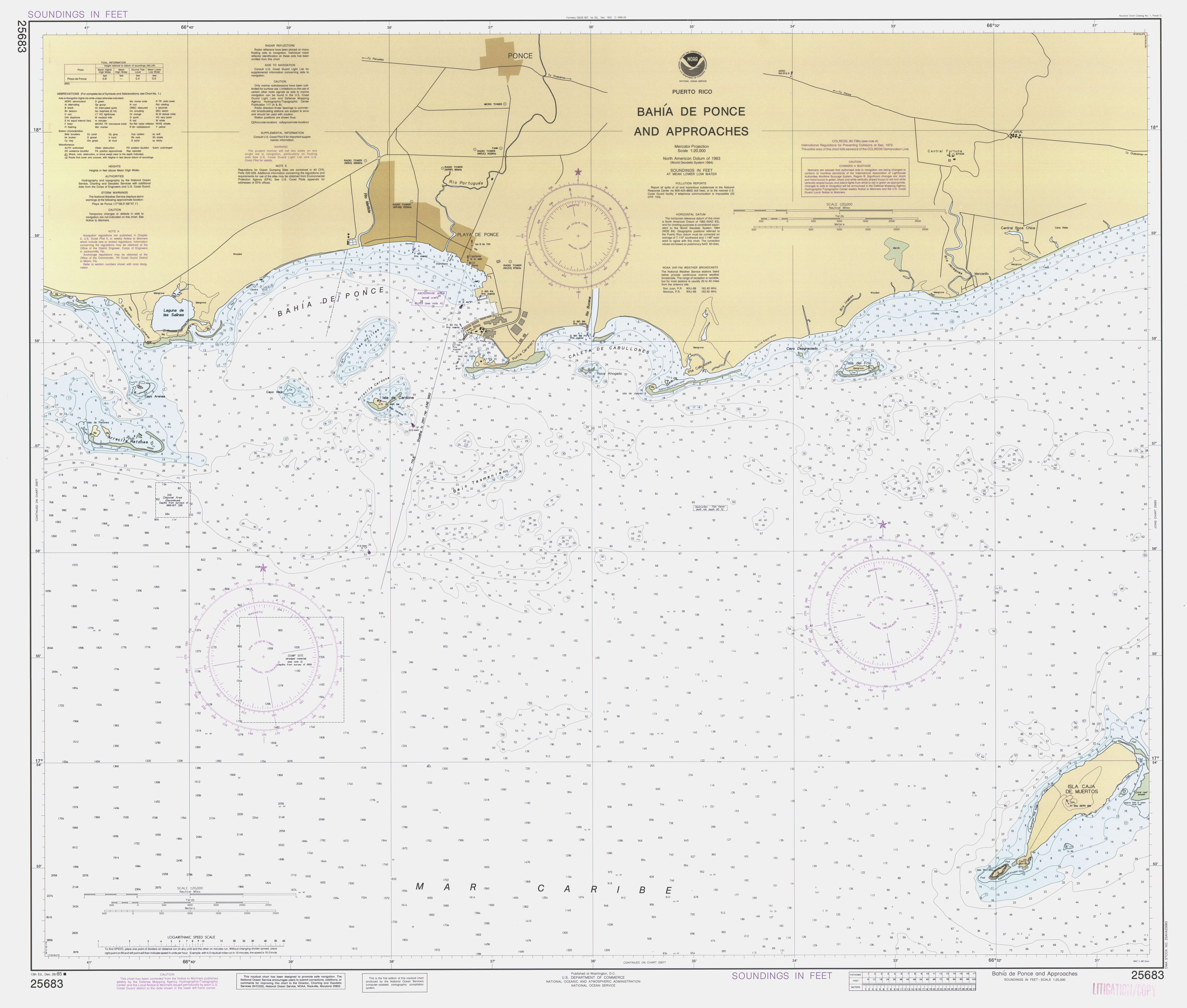
December 1985 map of Bahía de Ponce

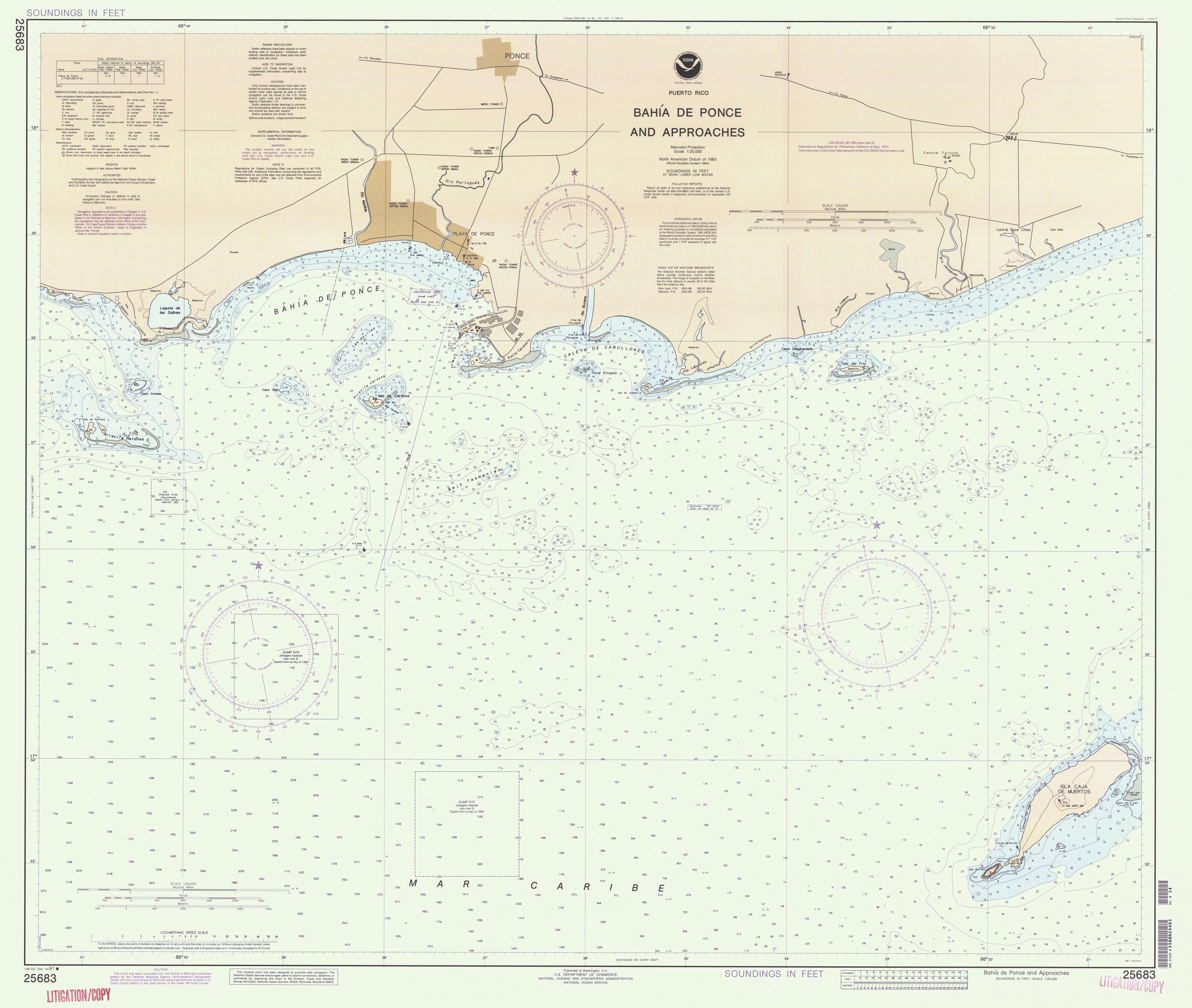
December 1991 map of Bahía de Ponce

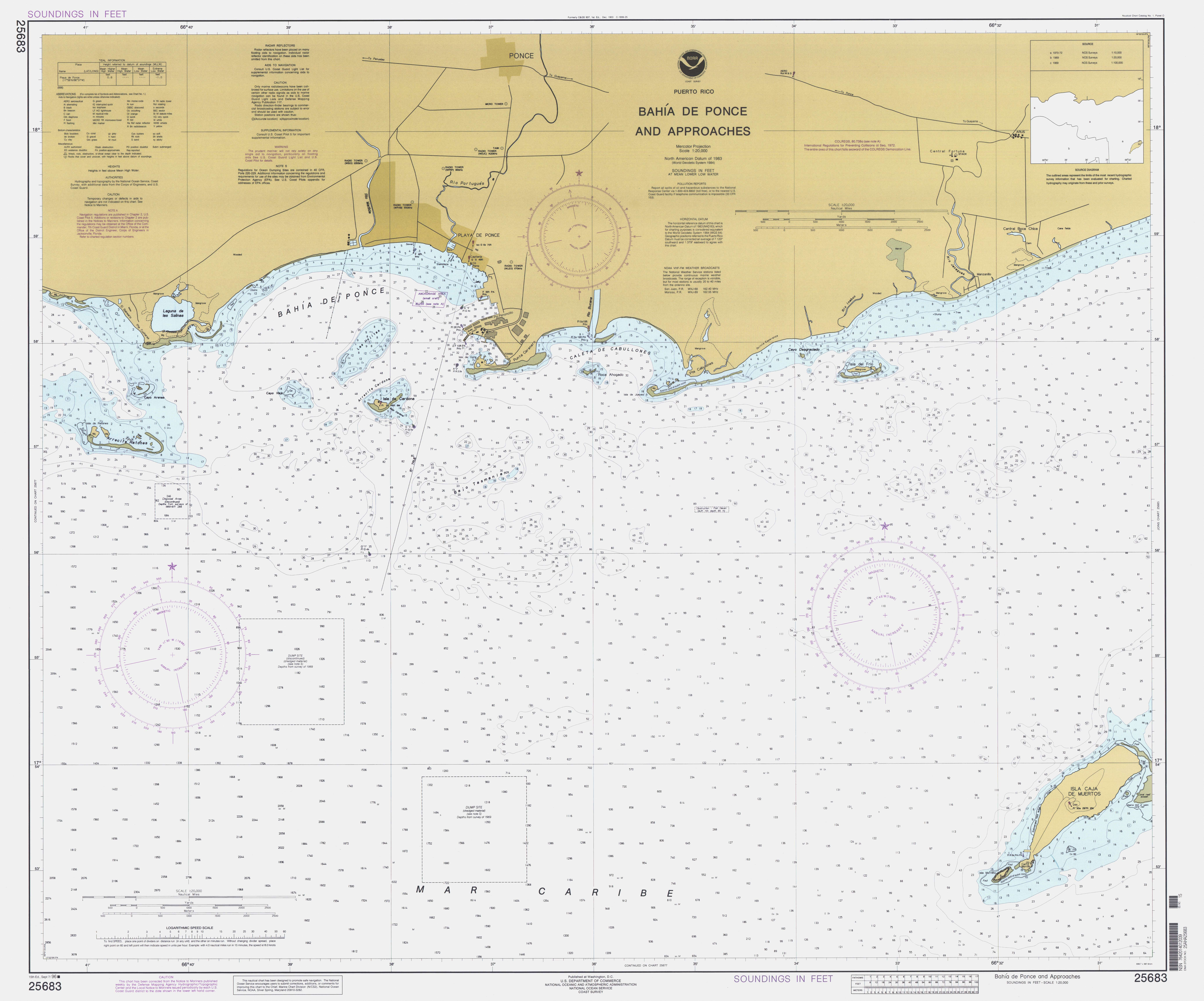
September 1996 map of Bahía de Ponce

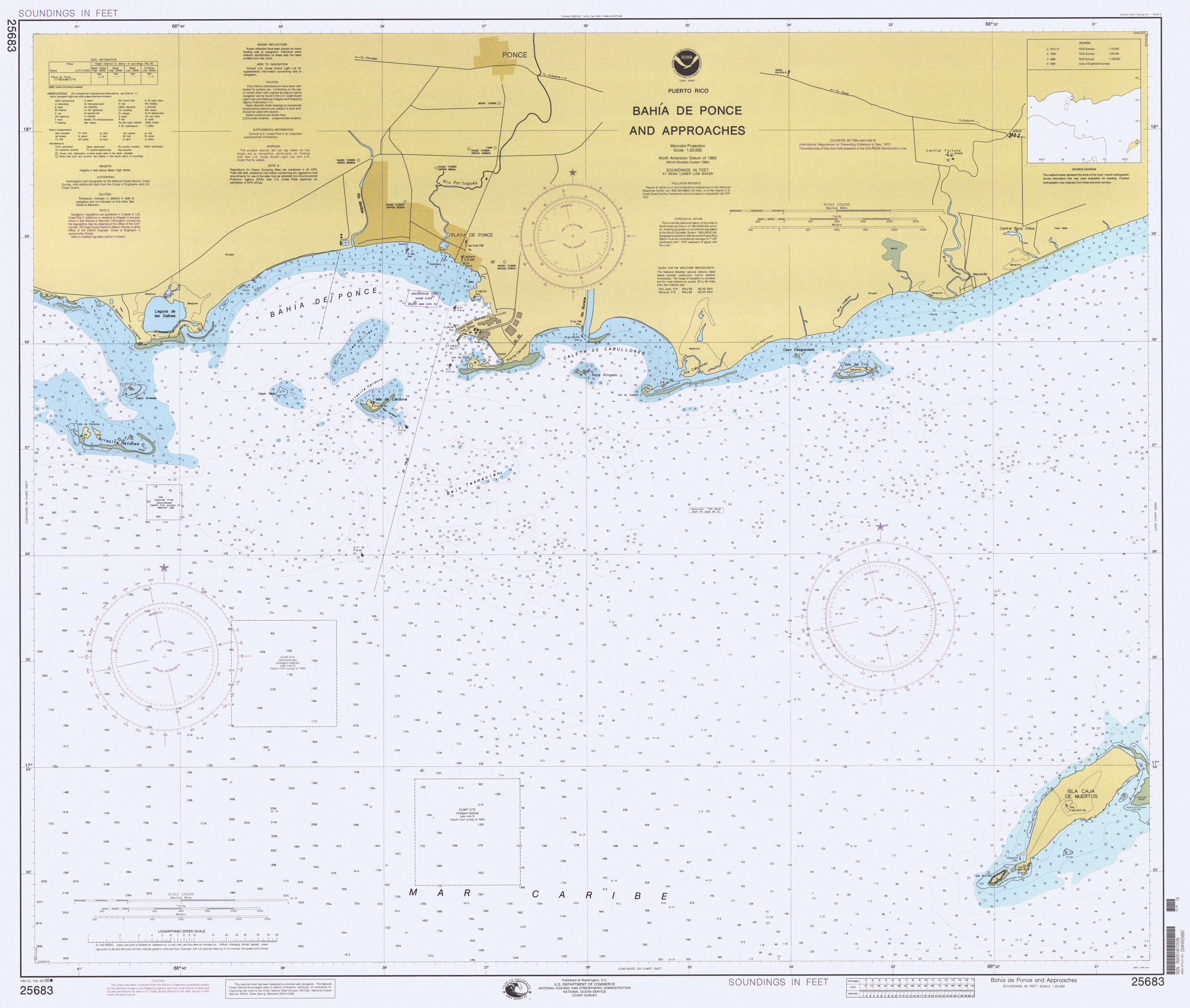
February 1998 map of Bahía de Ponce

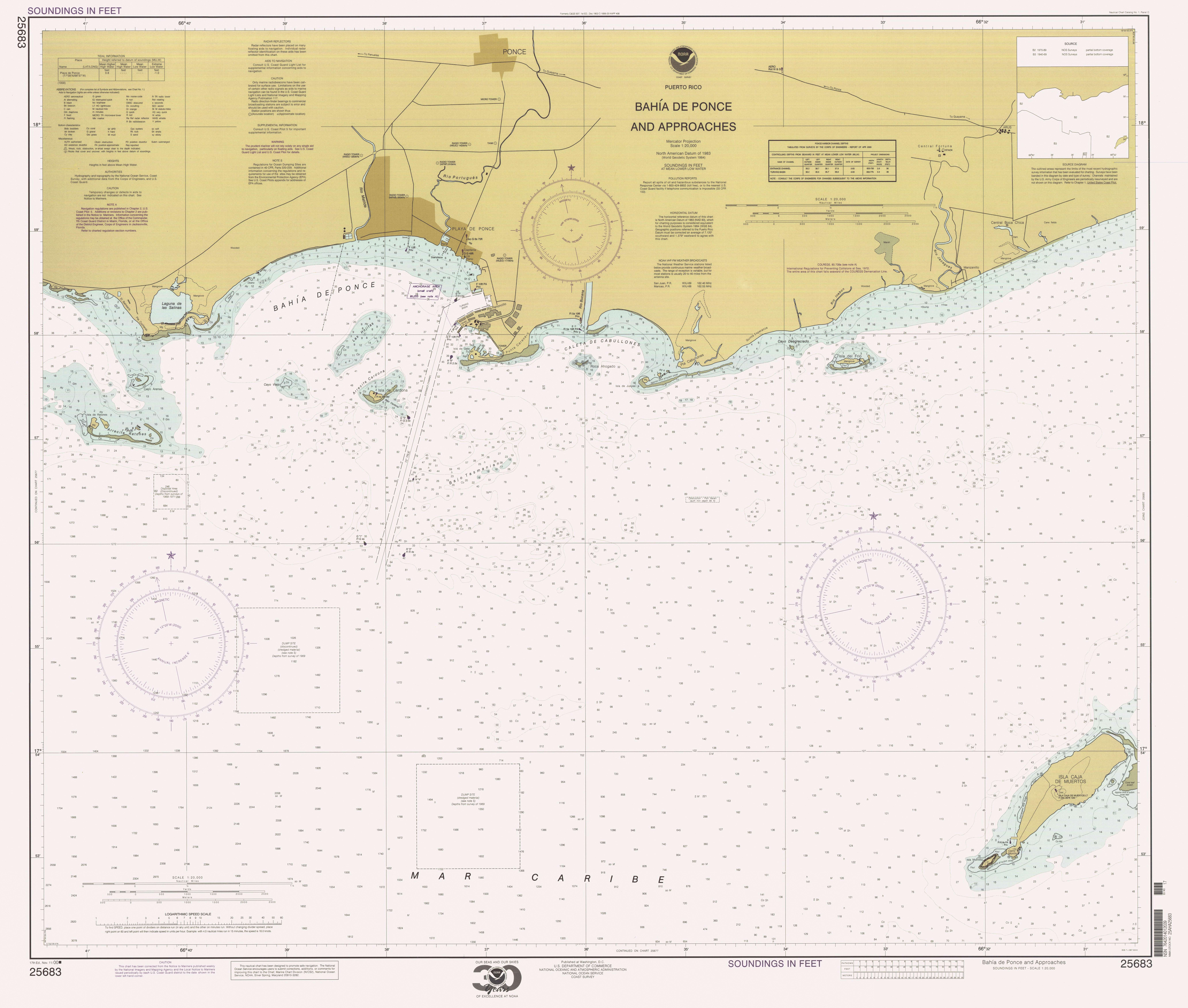
November 2000 map of Bahía de Ponce

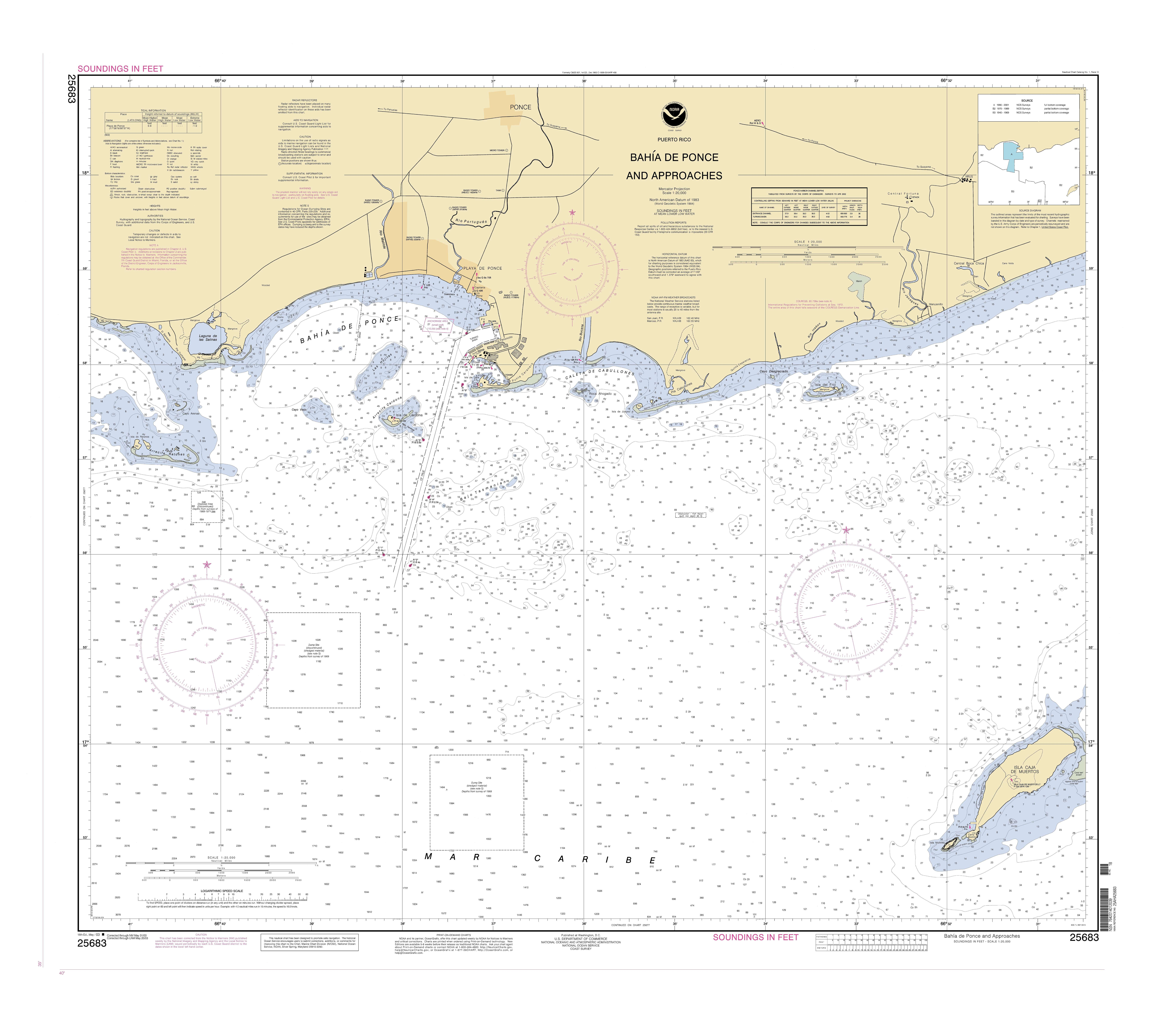
May 2003 map of Bahía de Ponce

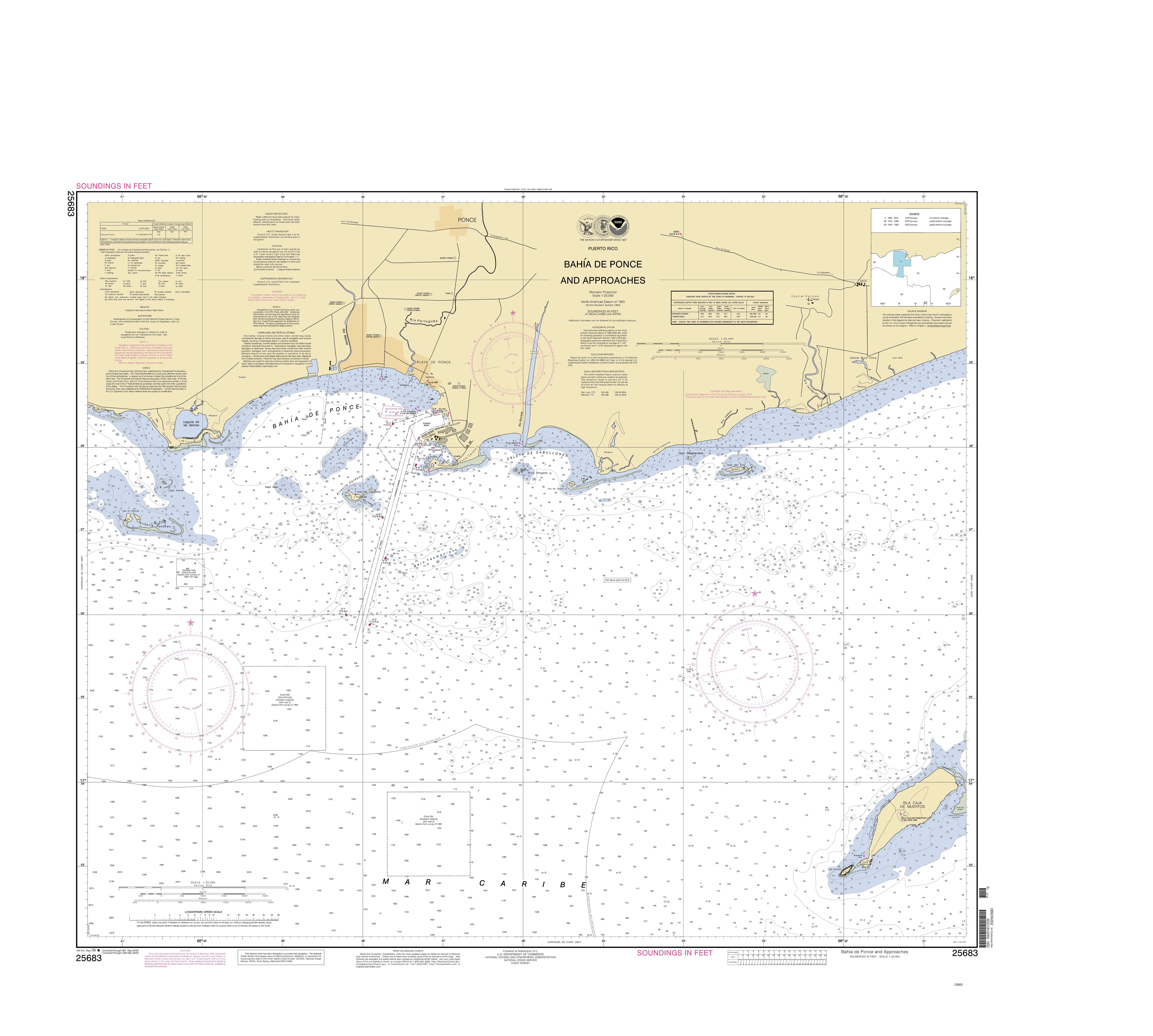
October 2012 map of Bahía de Ponce

=== Others ===
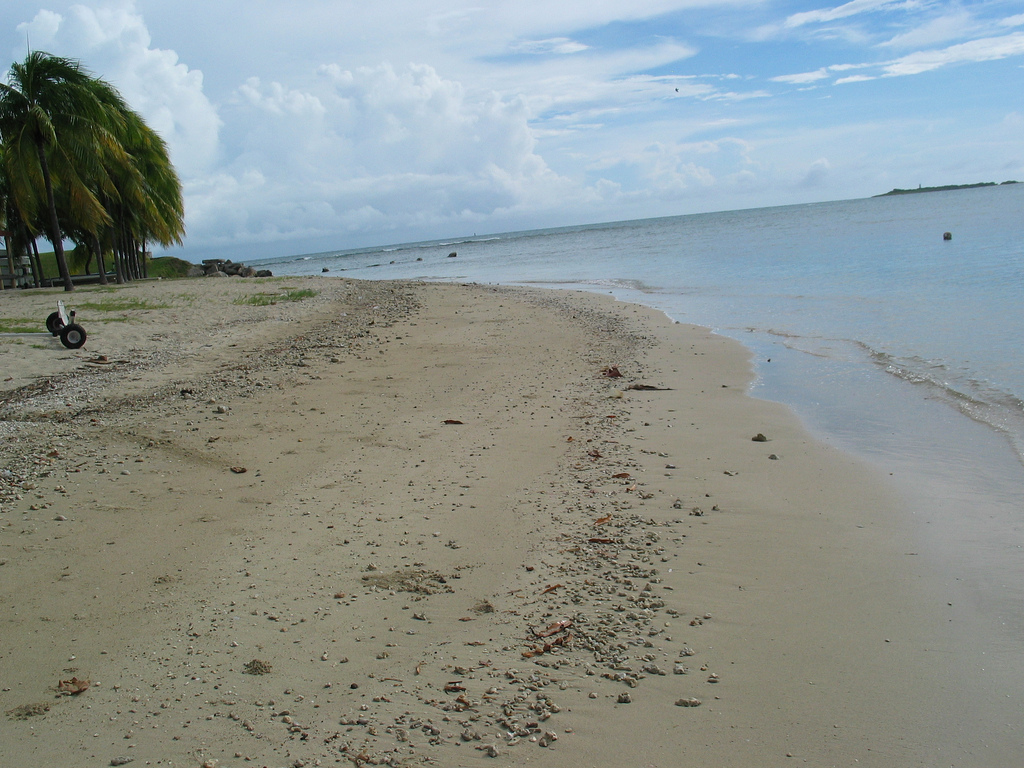
Beach at Bahía de Ponce (Club Náutico)

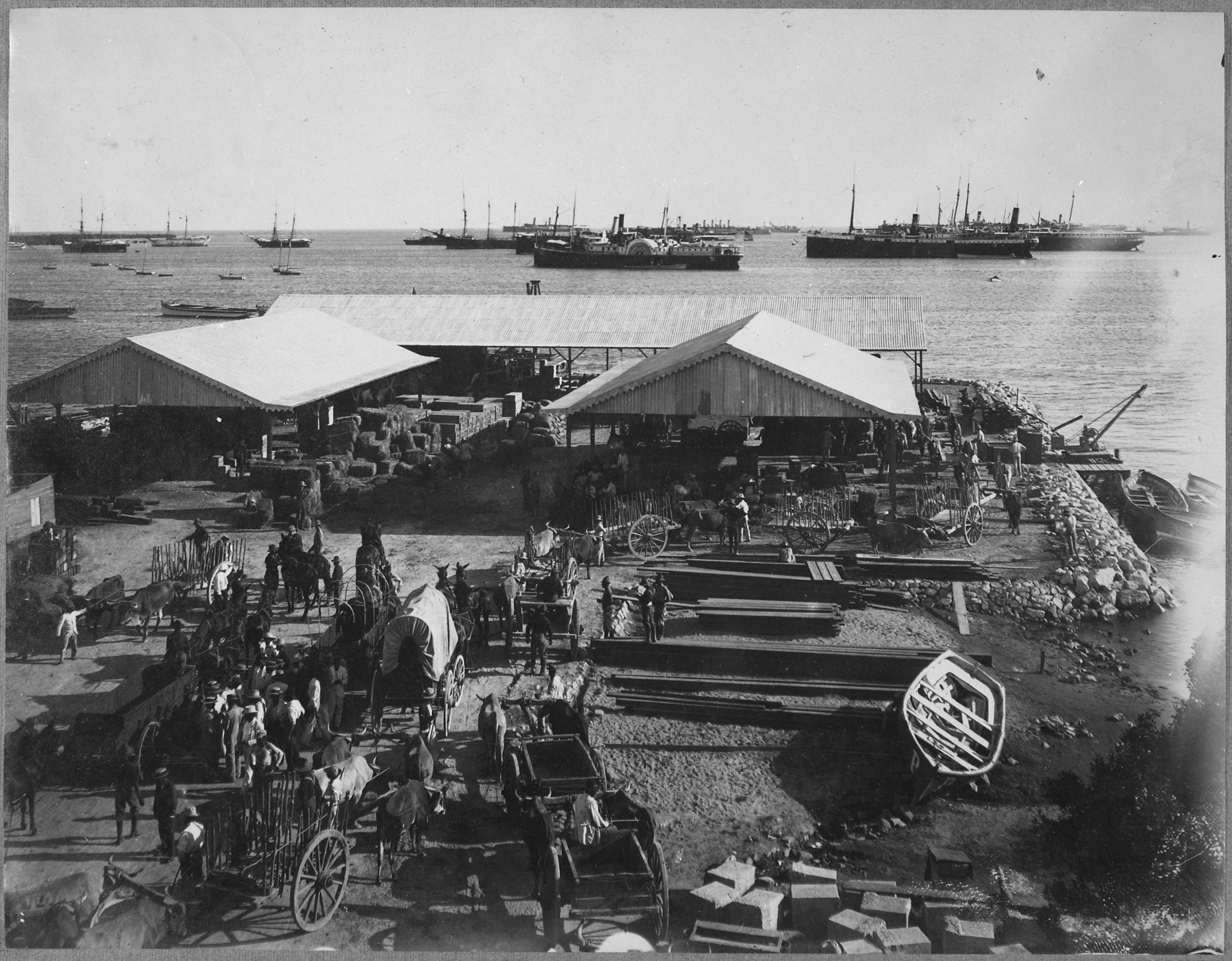
Ships at Bahía de Ponce in 1899

== See also ==
- List of rivers of Ponce, Puerto Rico
- San Juan Bay
- Mayagüez Bay
