= Mangrove tree distribution =

Global distribution of mangroves

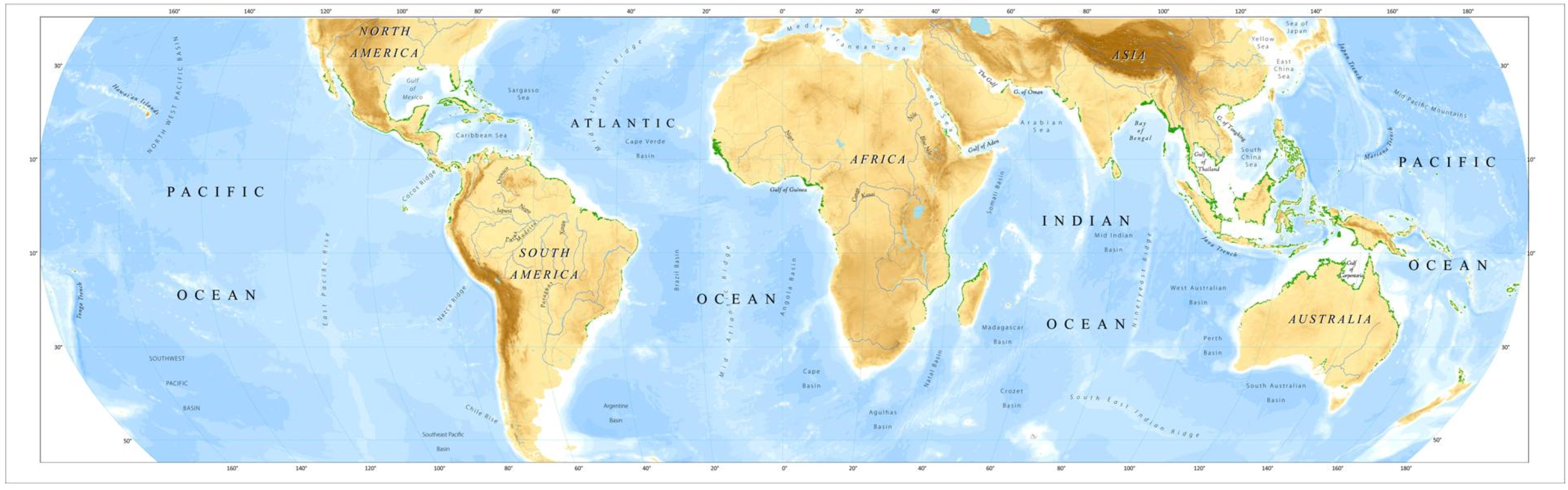
Global mangrove distribution, 2011 (click to enlarge)

Global mangrove distributions have fluctuated throughout human and geological history. The area covered by mangroves is influenced by a complex interaction between land position, rainfall hydrology, sea level, sedimentation, subsidence, storms and pest-predator relationships). In the last 50 years, human activities, mainly the expansion of shrimp farming along with agriculture and construction efforts, have strongly affected mangrove distributions, resulting in declines or expansions of worldwide mangrove area. These mangroves are riparian forests composed of trees and shrubs that are an important and crucial aspect of coastal land protection, climate change mitigation, and the maintenance and preservation of biodiversity. Mangrove forests are one of the world's most complex and most productive ecosystems, offering a multitude of benefits to their local ecosystems. They provide several important ecological services including coastal stabilization, juvenile fish habitats, the filtration of sediment and nutrients, water regulation, carbon storage, and storm protection. Mangrove loss has important implications for coastal ecological systems and human communities are dependent on healthy mangrove ecosystems. This article presents an overview of global mangrove forest biome trends in mangrove ecoregions distribution, as well as the cause of such changes.

As of 2010, mangroves are found in 117 countries and territories. Although distributed across 117 countries and territories, the top 15 mangrove holding nations contain approximately 75% of the global mangrove stock with Indonesia alone containing between 26% and 29% of the entire global mangrove stock.

The largest continuous area of mangrove forest is likely in-and-around the Sundarbans National Park in India and the Sundarbans Mangrove Forests in Bangladesh, which are both recognized by UNESCO as World Heritage Sites.

== Overview ==
Mangroves can be found in over one hundred countries and territories in the tropical and subtropical regions of the world. The largest percentage of mangroves is found between the 5° N and 5° S latitudes. Approximately 75% of world's mangroves are found in just 15 countries. Estimates of mangrove area based on remote sensing and global data tend to be lower than estimates based on literature and surveys for comparable periods.

In 2018, the Global Mangrove Watch Initiative released a global baseline based on remote sensing and global data for 2010 (Giri et al., 2011). They estimated the total mangrove forest area of the world as of 2010 at 137,600 km^{2} (53,100 mi^{2}), spanning 118 countries and territories. Following the conventions for identifying geographic regions from the Ramsar Convention on Wetlands, researchers also reported that Asia has the largest share (38.7%) of the world's mangroves, followed by Latin America and the Caribbean (20.3%), Africa (20.0%), Oceania (11.9%), and Northern America (8.4%).

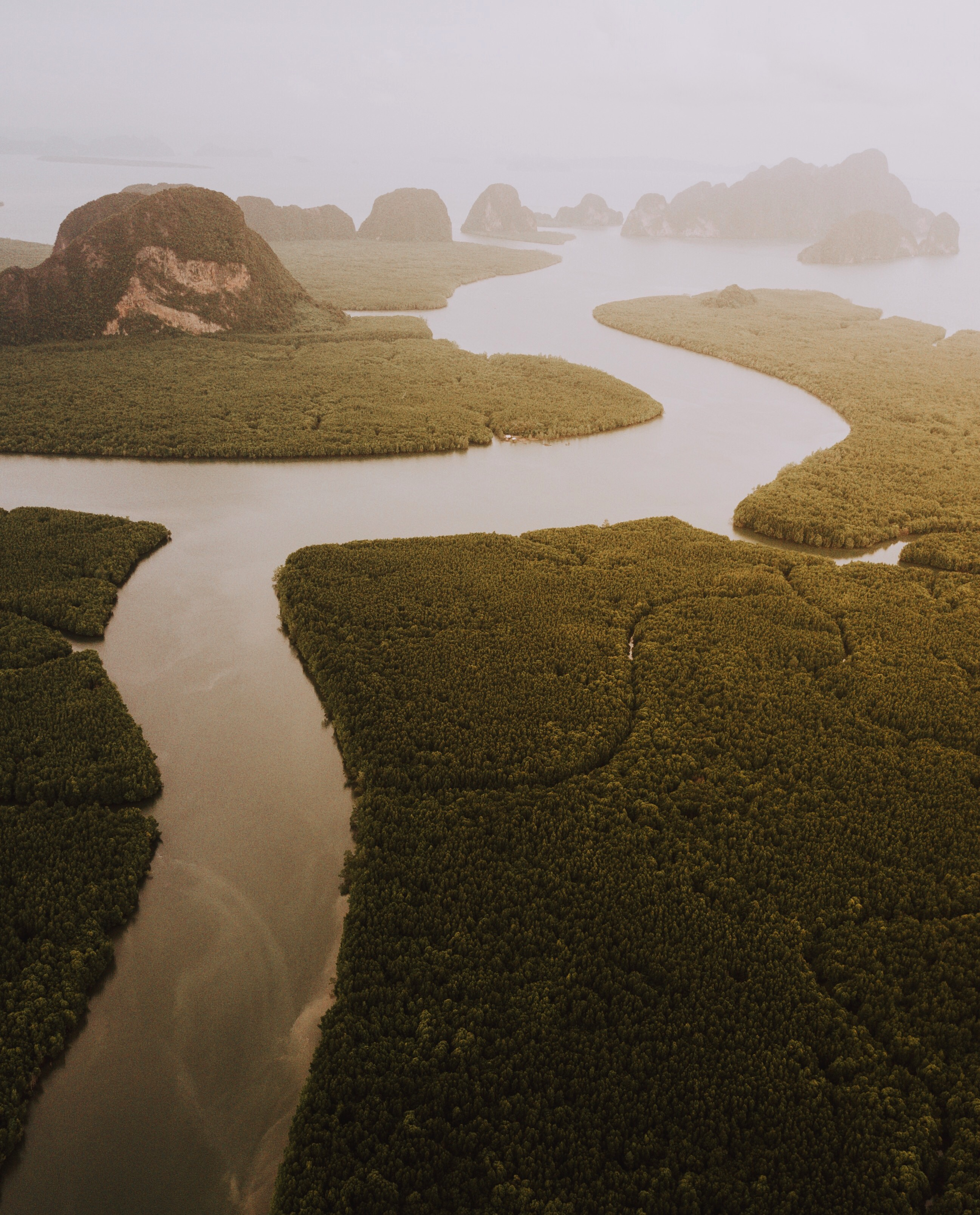
Part of Ao Phang Nga National Park – the largest area of native mangrove forest in Thailand.

Top 20 countries by area of mangrove coverage in 2014
Rank	Country	Tree cover (km^{2}) in mangrove forests	Tree cover (km^{2}) in mangrove biome
1	Indonesia	23,143	42,278
2	Brazil	7,663	17,287
3	India	4,921	7,616
4	Malaysia	4,691	7,616
5	Papua New Guinea	4,169	6,236
6	Australia	3,315	3,314
7	Mexico	2,985	6,036
8	Nigeria	2,653	6,908
9	Myanmar	2,508	3,783
10	Venezuela	2,401	7,516
11	Philippines	2,060	2,084
12	Thailand	1,876	3,936
13	Bangladesh	1,773	2,314
14	Colombia	1,672	6,236
15	Cuba	1,624	2,407
16	United States	1,553	1,554
17	Panama	1,323	2,673
18	Mozambique	1,223	2,658
19	Cameroon	1,113	1,323
20	Gabon	1,081	3,864
21	Ecuador	935	1,906

== By geographical region ==
=== Africa ===
There are important mangrove swamps in Kenya, Tanzania, the Democratic Republic of the Congo (DRC), and Madagascar, with swamps in the latter even admixing at the coastal verge with dry deciduous forests.

Nigeria has Africa's largest mangrove coverage, spanning 36,000 km^{2} (14,000 mi^{2}). Oil spills and leaks have destroyed much of this in the last 50 years, damaging the local fishing economy and water quality.

Along the coast of the Red Sea, both on the Egyptian side and in the Gulf of Aqaba, mangroves composed primarily of Avicennia marina and Rhizophora mucronata grow in about 28 stands that cover about 5.25 km^{2} (2.0 mi^{2}). Almost all Egyptian mangrove stands are now protected.

There are mangroves off the east coast of South Africa extending as far south as the Tylomnqa River (33°13′26.1″N 27°34′50.2″E). Some mangrove stands exist in the St Lucia estuary within iSimangaliso Wetland Park.

=== North America ===
==== Central America and the Caribbean ====
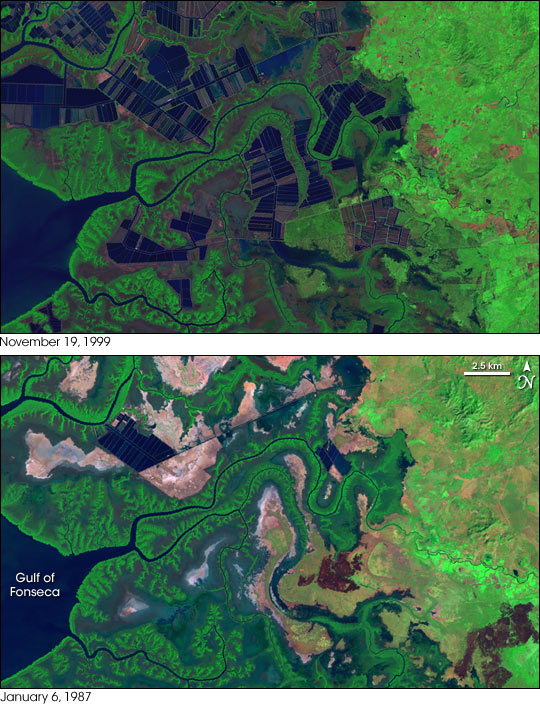
The same area in Honduras shown in 1987 (bottom) and 1999 showing the corresponding removal of mangrove swamps for shrimp farming.

Mangroves occur on the Pacific and Caribbean coasts of Belize, Costa Rica, El Salvador, Guatemala, Honduras, Nicaragua, and Panama. Mangroves can also be found in many of the Antilles including Puerto Rico, Cuba, and Hispaniola, as well as other islands in the West Indies such as the Bahamas.

===== Belize =====
The nation of Belize has the highest overall percentage of forest cover of any of the Central American countries. Belize's mangrove cover assumes the form not only of mangrove forest, but also of scrubs, savannas, and other vegetation types. A 2010 satellite-based study of Belize's mangroves by the World Wildlife Fund (WWF) and the Water Center for the Humid Tropics of Latin America and the Caribbean found, in 2010, that mangroves covered roughly 746.84 km^{2} (288.36 mi^{2}), or 3.4% of Belize's territory.

In 1980, by contrast, mangrove cover stood at 762.5 km^{2} (294.4 mi^{2}) — also 3.4% of Belize's territory, although, based on the work of mangrove researcher Simon Zisman, Belize's mangrove cover in 1980 was estimated to represent 98.7% of the precolonial extent of those ecosystems. Belize's mangrove cover in 2010 was thus estimated to represent 96.7% of the precolonial cover. Assessing changes in Belize's mangrove cover over a 30-year period was possible because of Belize's participation in the Regional Visualization and Monitoring System, a regional observatory jointly implemented by CATHALAC, RCMRD, ICIMOD, NASA, USAID, and other partners.

==== Continental United States ====
Red and white mangrove communities are confined to Florida south of 29°N (see Florida mangroves). Black mangroves can be found up to 30°N on the east coast of Florida, and in isolated sections of the wider Gulf Coast, including Texas.

==== Mexico ====
In Mexico, four species of mangrove predominate: Rhizophora mangle, Laguncularia racemosa, Avicennia germinans, and Conocarpus erectus. During an inventory conducted by CONABIO between 2006 and 2008, 7,700.57 km^{2} (2,973.21 mi^{2}) of mangrove were counted. Of this total, 55% are located in the Yucatán Peninsula.

Significant mangals include the Marismas Nacionales-San Blas mangroves found in Sinaloa and Nayarit.

=== South America ===
==== Brazil ====
The second largest region of mangrove forests is Brazil which contains approximately 9,900 km^{2} (3,800 sq mi) of mangrove forests and approximately 17,287 km^{2} (6,675 sq mi) of mangrove biome which is the whole mangrove forest system that might not include mangrove trees.

From 1985 to 2018 mangrove area increased about 200 km^{2} (77 sq mi) which is roughly a 2% increase. This might not mean that mangroves are truly in recovery because early satellite coverage was limited and current years have more data available. From 1999 to 2018 there has been about a 2% loss of mangrove area.

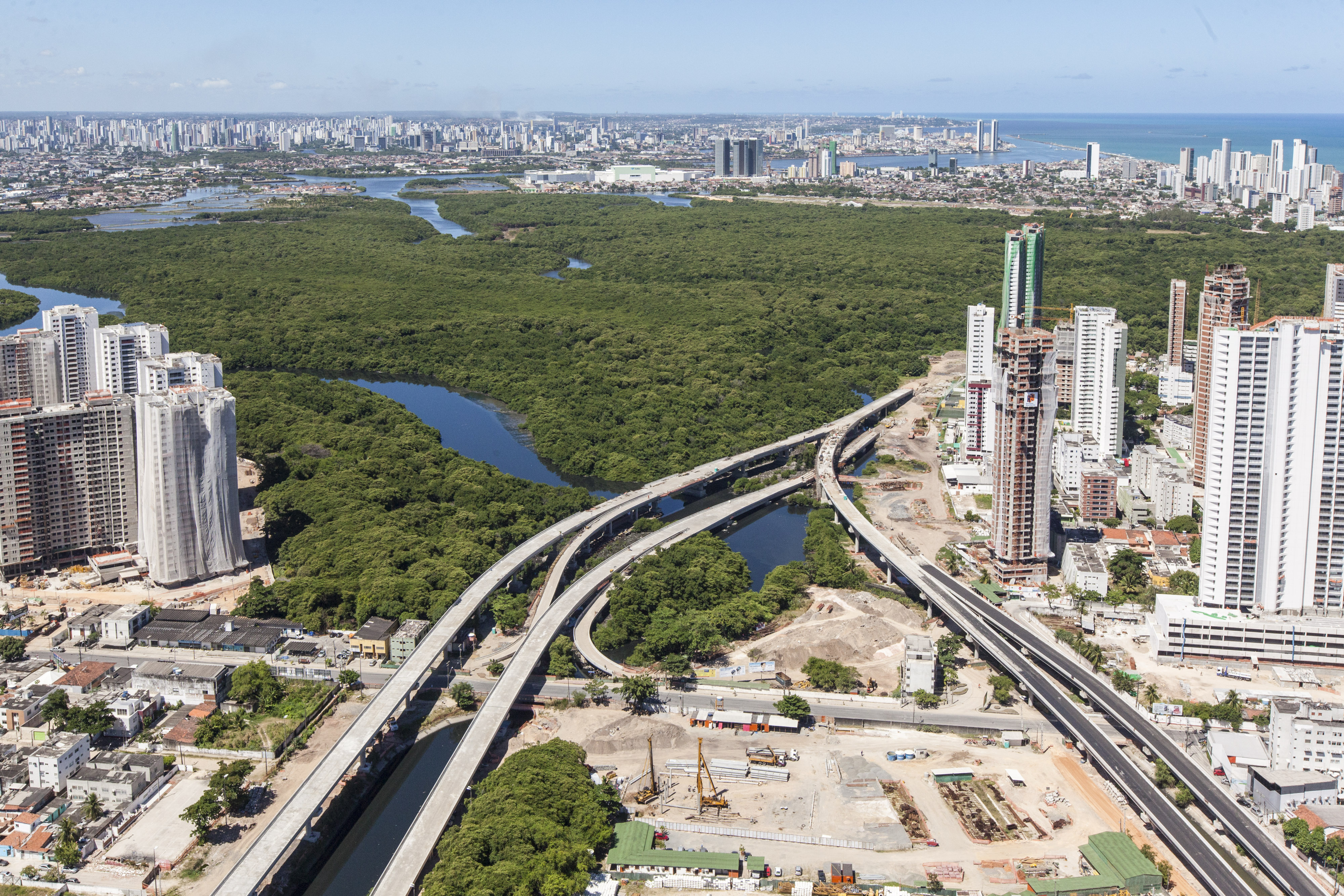
Recife in Brazil, nicknamed the "Manguetown", has the largest urban mangrove forest in the world.

Mangrove Forest Percentage in Brazil
State	Forest Coverage (%)
Maranhão	46.46
Pará	22.28
Amapá	8.87
Bahia	7.10
Sergipe	2.14
Paraná	1.95
São Paulo	1.88
Ceará	1.79
Pernambuco	1.51
Rio Grande do Nortre	1.36
Paraíba	1.26
Rio de Janeiro	1.05
Espírito Santo	0.69
Santa Catarina	0.65
Piauí	0.57
Alagoas	0.45

==== Columbia ====
Colombia possesses large mangrove forests on both its Caribbean and Pacific coasts.

==== Ecuador ====
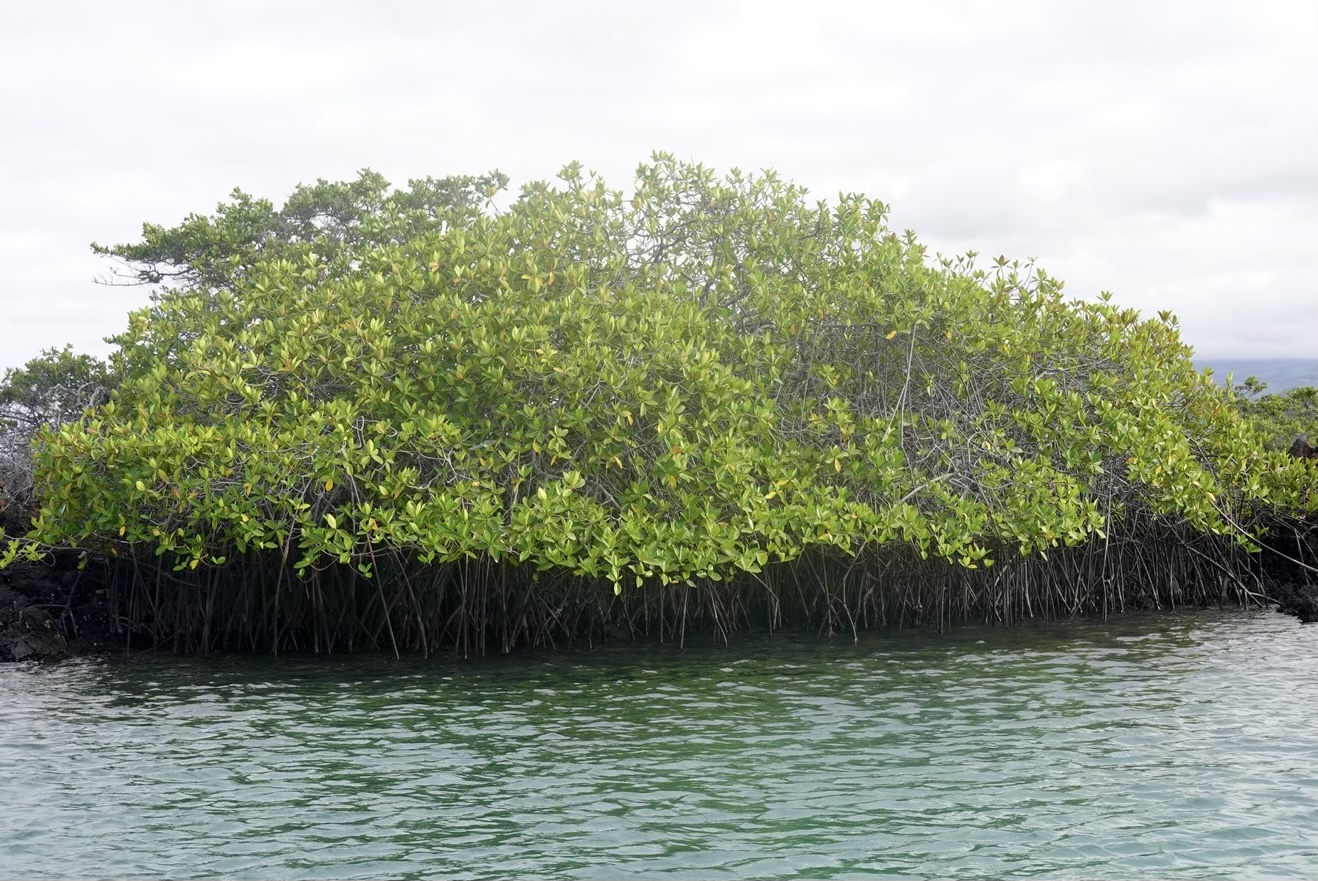
Mangroves thrive in the brackish waters of the Galapagos Islands.

Ecuador has substantial remaining mangrove forests in the provinces of El Oro, Guayas, Manabi, and Esmeraldas, with limited forest remaining in Santa Elena. Mangrove forests in this country can largely be found along estuaries of numerous rivers such as the Mataje-Santiago-Cayapas, Muisne, Cojimíes, Chone, Guayas, and Jubones-Santa Rosa-Arenillas . The northern portion of Esmeraldas province has a large pristine mangrove forest that is preserved as the Reserva Ecológica Cayapas-Mataje (REMACAN) and is an original Ramsar site. This forest is the most preserved within Ecuador and likely the most pristine forest along the Pacific Coast of the Americas.

The only other major mangrove holding in Esmeraldas is in-and-around the community of Muisne and the Rio Muisne Estuary Swampland Wildlife Refuges. The mangroves in-and-around the estuaries of Muisne have decreased in area from 32.22 to 10.65 km^{2} (12.44 to 4.11 mi^{2}) from the period between 1971 and 2005. During this time, commercial shrimp aquaculture has become the dominant land-cover within this estuary environment.

On the border of Esmeraldas province and Manabí province is a formerly large area of mangrove within Cojimies Estuary. The mangroves in this estuary are some of the most degraded in Ecuador with only 19% of 1971 mangrove area remaining as of 1998, although mangrove has recovered since this date. Within Manabí the major mangrove holding estuary is the Chone estuary situated near the city of Bahía de Caráquez. Again, Chone has undergone substantial mangrove deforestation since the advent of commercial aquaculture in Ecuador. However, mangrove loss appears to have halted in this estuary and mangrove regrowth driven by local fisherman is now occurring.

The estuary within the Gulf of Guayaquil has seen large increases in aquaculture land use between 2000 and 2022 in areas that border protected mangrove zones. The Guayas province to the North lost 18,029 hectares of mangrove land cover from 1969 to 1999. Jumping forward to 2014, we can see that industrial aquaculture shrimp farms then occupied 22% of the estuary, decreasing mangrove land cover to 39% from a baseline of 46% from 1985.

==== Peru ====
Peru has two small regions of mangrove located in the Department of Tumbes, north-west of the country on the Ecuadorian Border, and also in the Piura region, where the "Manglares de Vice" in the Sechura Province of Piura is the southernmost region of the Pacific to hold mangroves.

==== Suriname ====
The Mangrove forests of Suriname have a height of 20–25 m (66–82 ft) and are found mainly in the coastal area. There are six types of mangroves, namely two types of Avicennia germinans (parwa or black mangroves), three types of Rhizophora mangle (mangro or red mangroves) and a small mangrove species Laguncularia racemosa (akira or tjila, white mangrove).

==== Venezuela ====
Venezuela's northern Caribbean island, Margarita, possesses mangrove forests in the Parque nacional Laguna de La Restinga. Venezuela has 4% of the world's mangroves, with an extension of 6,735 km^{2} (2,600 mi^{2}).

=== Asia ===
Mangroves occur on Asia's south coast, throughout the Indian subcontinent, in all Southeast Asian countries, and on islands in the Indian Ocean, Persian Gulf, Arabian Sea, Bay of Bengal, South China Sea, East China Sea and the Pacific. The mangal is particularly prevalent in the deltas of large Asian rivers.

==== Indonesia ====
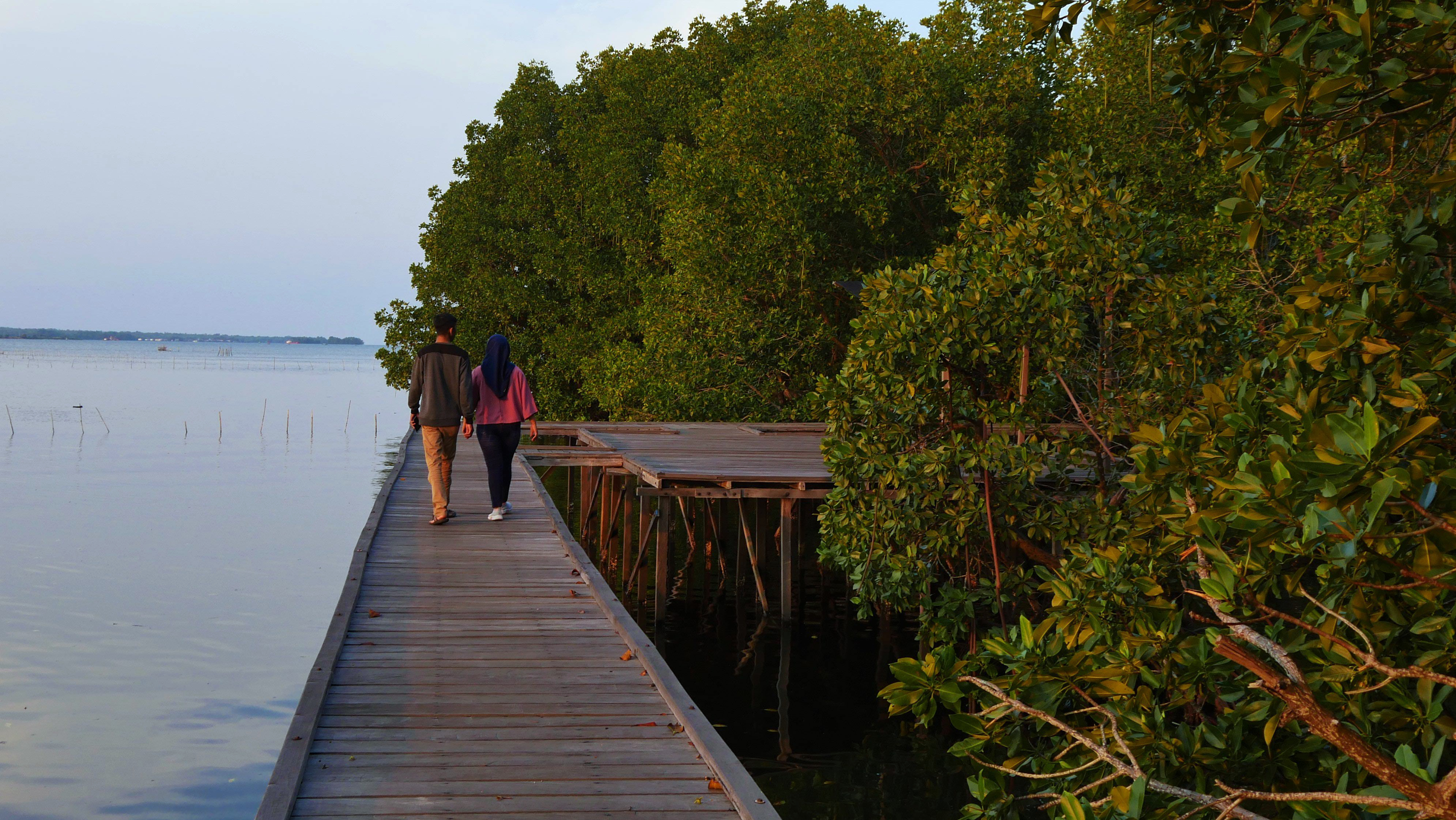
Bontang Mangrove Park in Kutai National Park, East Kalimantan, Indonesia.

In the Indonesian Archipelago, mangroves occur around much of Papua province, Sumatra, Borneo, Sulawesi, Maluku and the surrounding islands. Indonesia has around 93,600 km^{2} (36,100 mi^{2}) of mangrove forests, but 48% is categorized as 'moderately damaged' and 23% as 'badly damaged'.

==== Japan ====
The most extensive mangrove forests of the Ryukyu Islands in East China Sea occur on Iriomote Island of the Yaeyama Islands, Okinawa, Japan. Seven types of mangroves are recognised on Iriomote Island.

The northern limit of mangrove forests in the Indomalaya Ecozone is considered to be Tanegashima Island, Kyushu, Japan.

==== Malaysia ====
On the Malay Peninsula, mangroves cover an estimated 1,089.7 km^{2} (420.7 mi^{2}), while most of the remaining 5,320 km^{2} (2,054 mi^{2}) mangroves in Malaysia are on the island of Borneo.

==== Philippines ====
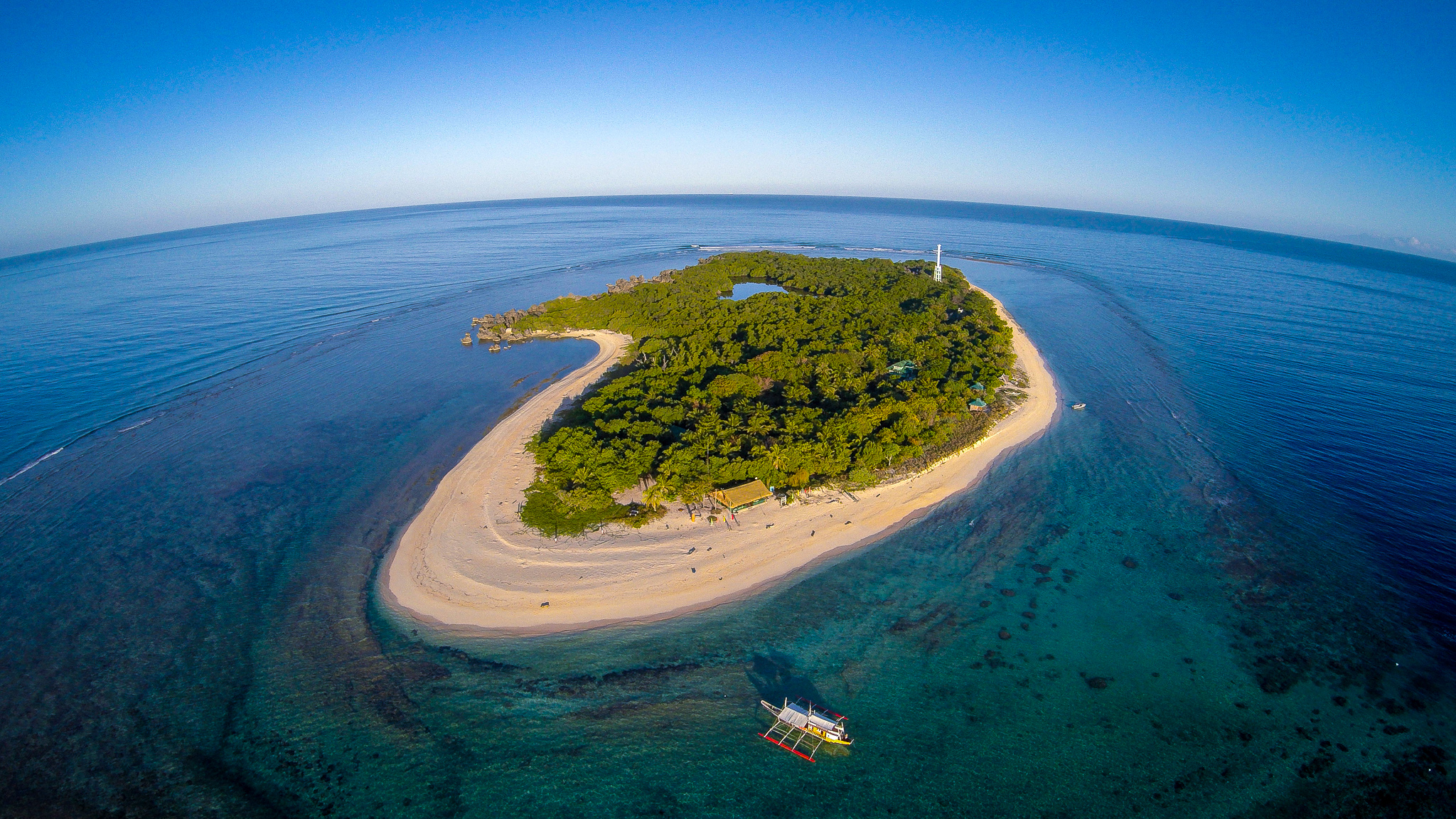
Apo Island in the Apo Reef Natural Park, Mindoro Strait, Philippines, with a lagoon mangrove forest covering half the island.

The Philippines, with the fifth longest coastline in the world, holds at least 50% of known mangrove species and is considered one of the top 15 most mangrove-rich countries. Philippine mangrove forests cover an estimated 2,473.62 km^{2} (955.07 sq mi) of coastline as of 2003, which comprise 3% of the total forest cover remaining in the country. The island with the largest mangrove cover is Mindanao, with 29% of the national total. Mindanao and Palawan also have the largest pristine old-growth mangrove forests (at 45.82 km^{2} (17.69 sq mi) and 53.17 km^{2} (20.53 sq mi), respectively). The islands suffering from the most extensive mangrove deforestation are Luzon and Mindoro.

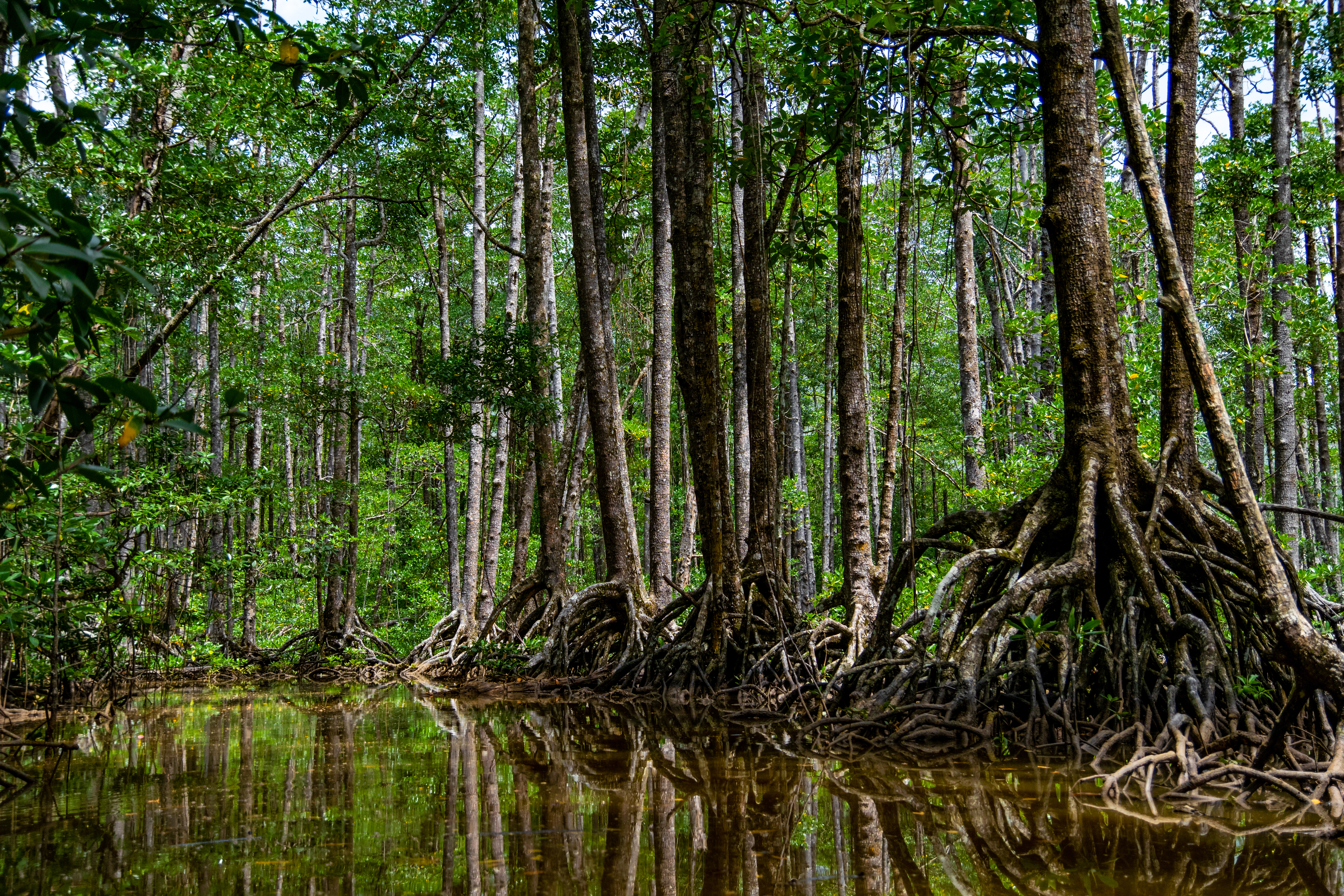
Old-growth mangrove forest in Puerto Princesa, Palawan, Philippines.

The provinces with the highest mangrove coverage are Palawan (22.2%), Sulu (8%), Zamboanga del Norte and Zamboanga del Sur (9.86%), Surigao del Norte and Surigao del Sur (6.8%), Eastern Samar and Western Samar (6.1%), Quezon (5.5%), Tawi-Tawi (4.4%), Bohol (3.69%), and Basilan (2.97%).

19% of the total mangrove area are within protected areas. These protected areas include the Northern Sierra Madre Natural Park (eastern Luzon), Bakhawan Eco-Park (Panay), Malampaya Sound Protected Landscape and Seascape (northwestern Palawan), El Nido Managed Resource Protected Area (northwestern Palawan), Rasa Island Wildlife Sanctuary (central Palawan), Siargao Island Protected Landscape and Seascape (Siargao), Tañon Strait Protected Seascape (Negros and Cebu), Biri Larosa Protected Landscape and Seascape (northern Samar), Dumanquilas Bay Protected Landscape and Seascape (western Mindanao), Mt. Guiting-Guiting Natural Park (Sibuyan Island, Romblon), and the Calauit Safari Park (Calauit Island, Calamian Islands).

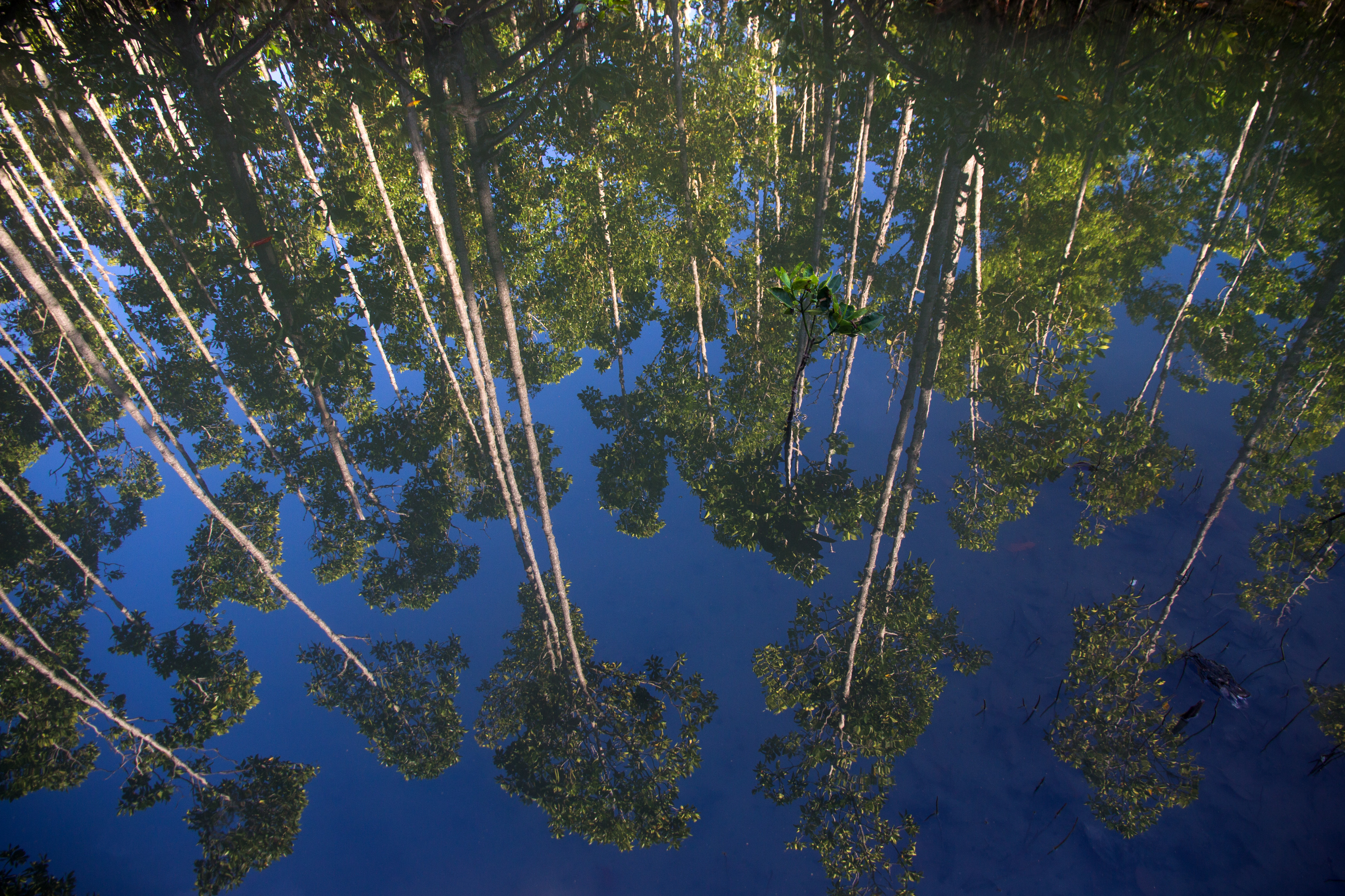
Reflection of mangrove trees in the Bakhawan Eco-Park in Panay, Philippines.

In the 1920s, the Philippines had a mangrove cover estimated at between 4,000 km^{2} (1,500 mi^{2}) to 5,000 km^{2} (1,900 mi^{2}). It dropped to a low of 1,600 km^{2} (620 mi^{2}) by 1994. The leading cause for mangrove deforestation in the Philippines is the commercial development of the areas for aquaculture. Between 1968 and 1983, 2,370 km^{2} (920 mi^{2}) of mangrove forest were lost to the creation of cultured ponds for farming fish, shrimp, and other aquatic resources. Urbanization is also the main cause of the loss of the formerly extensive mangrove forests in Manila Bay.

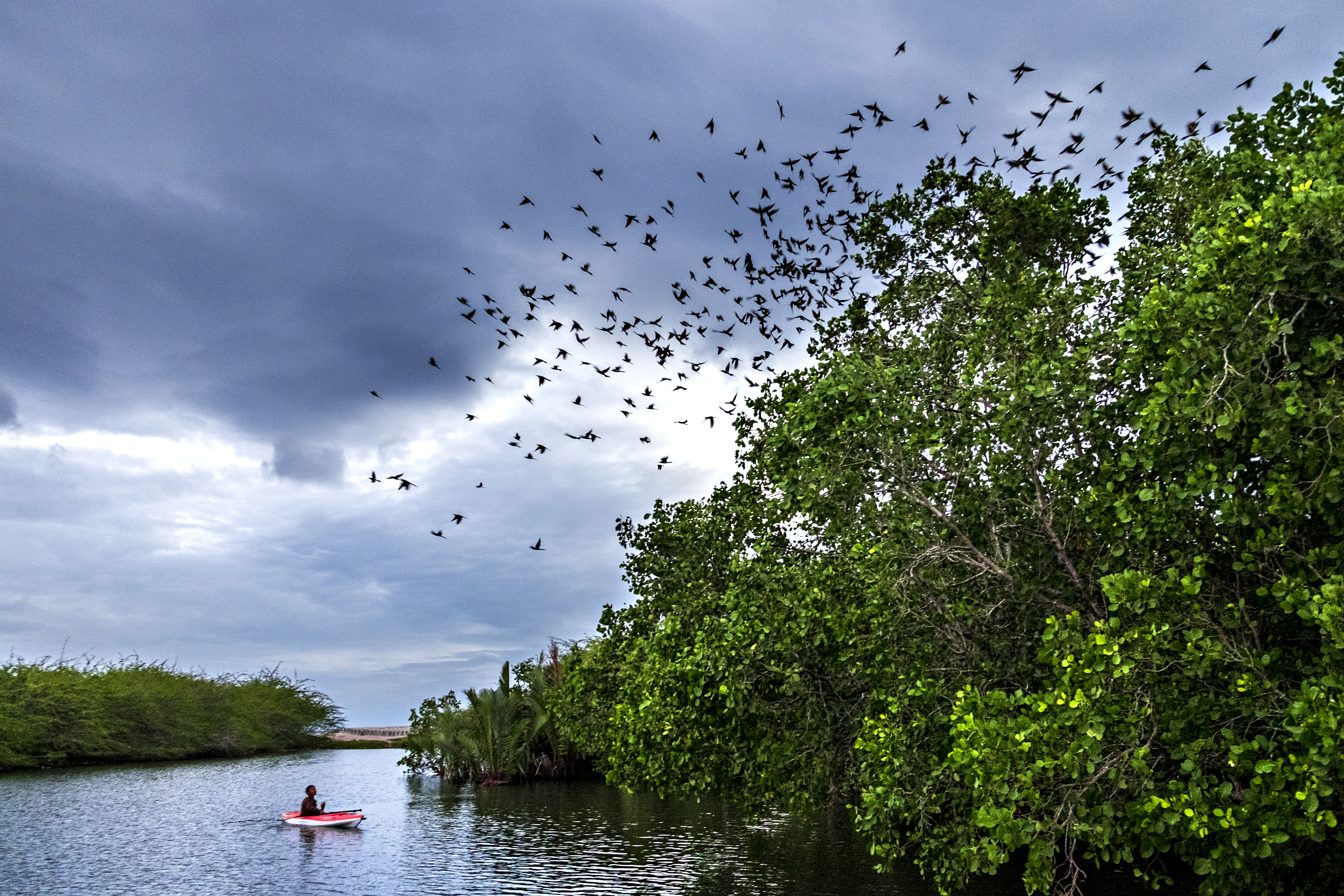
Olo-Olo Mangrove Forest and Ecopark in Batangas, Philippines.

Due to conservation measures it rose back to the current level by 2003 and mangrove populations are considered "relatively stable" by the World Bank. Several mangrove conservation and reforestation efforts have been completed. Some of the early ones failed due to the use of the wrong species for the wrong habitats and pests damaging monoculture reforestation sites. More successful reforestation efforts have identified that a key factor was community involvement and the education of local villages of the importance of mangrove forests to maintaining fish stocks, providing a natural barrier to typhoons and tsunamis, and providing habitats for migratory birds. Mangrove-friendly aquaculture technology is also disseminated by the government via training by the Bureau of Fisheries and Aquatic Resources (BFAR). Another recent approach is the promotion of mangrove forest ecotourism.

In line with mangrove promotion, development, and rehabilitation efforts in coastal areas, species diversity and the degree of impact of natural and anthropogenic activities on mangroves in nine coastal barangays of Mulanay, Quezon, Philippines were assessed. Results revealed that all nine barangays had low species diversity index. Taxonomic identification revealed eleven mangrove species – Avicennia marina, Avicennia rumphiana, Bruguiera gymnorrhiza, Ceriops decandra, Ceriops tagal, Excoecaria agallocha, Rhizophora apiculata, Rhizophora mucronata, Sonneratia alba, Xylocarpus granatum, and Xylocarpus moluccensis belonging to five families. Impact analysis revealed that Patabog registered moderate impact, San Isidro and Canuyep with high impact, and Sta. Rosa, Sto. Niño, Buntayog, Amuguis and Ibabang Yuni were greatly affected by combined natural disturbances and anthropogenic activities.

In 1991, the cutting and harvesting of all mangrove species was banned under Republic Act 7161. The conversion of mangrove forest areas for fishpond development was also banned under Republic Act 8550 (the Philippine Fisheries Code of 1998). Enforcement of these laws remain problematic. The ban also affects small communities which previously partnered with the government to grow and harvest mangrove forests for timber, firewood, and other purposes.

==== Singapore ====
An island country of 735 km^{2}, mangrove forests are found along some coastal areas of the main island and other smaller islands like Pulau Semakau, Pulau Tekong and Pulau Ubin.

Sungei Buloh Wetland Reserve, Pasir Ris Park and Chek Jawa are some areas with publicly accessible walking trails within mangrove forests.

==== Taiwan ====
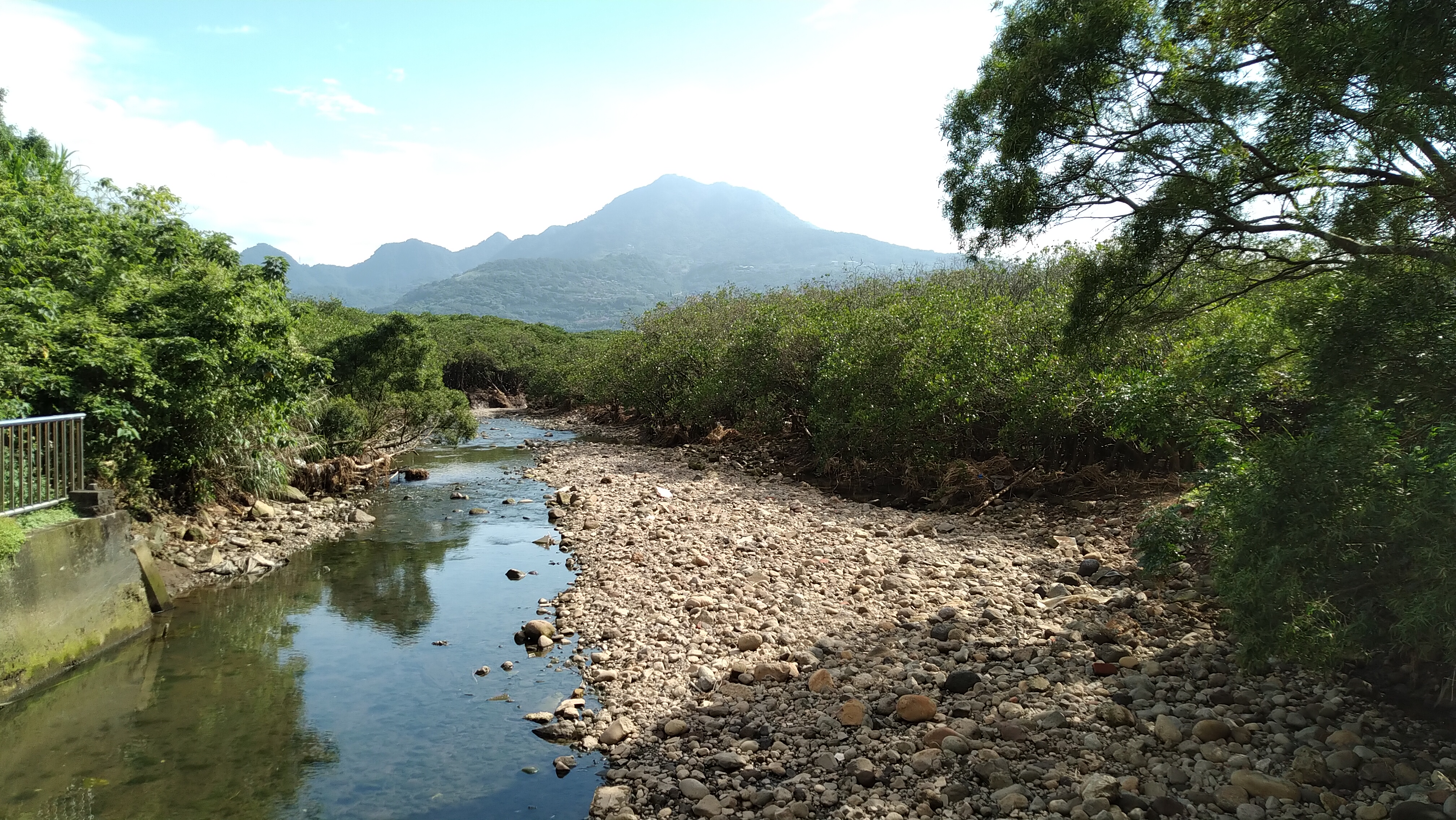
Tamsui Mangrove Forest in New Taipei City, Taiwan.

The three most important mangrove forests of Taiwan are: Tamsui River in New Taipei, Zhonggang River (zh) in Miaoli County and the Sicao Wetlands in Tainan. Four types of mangrove exist in Taiwan. Some places have been developed as scenic areas, such as the log raft routes in Sihcao.

==== Vietnam ====
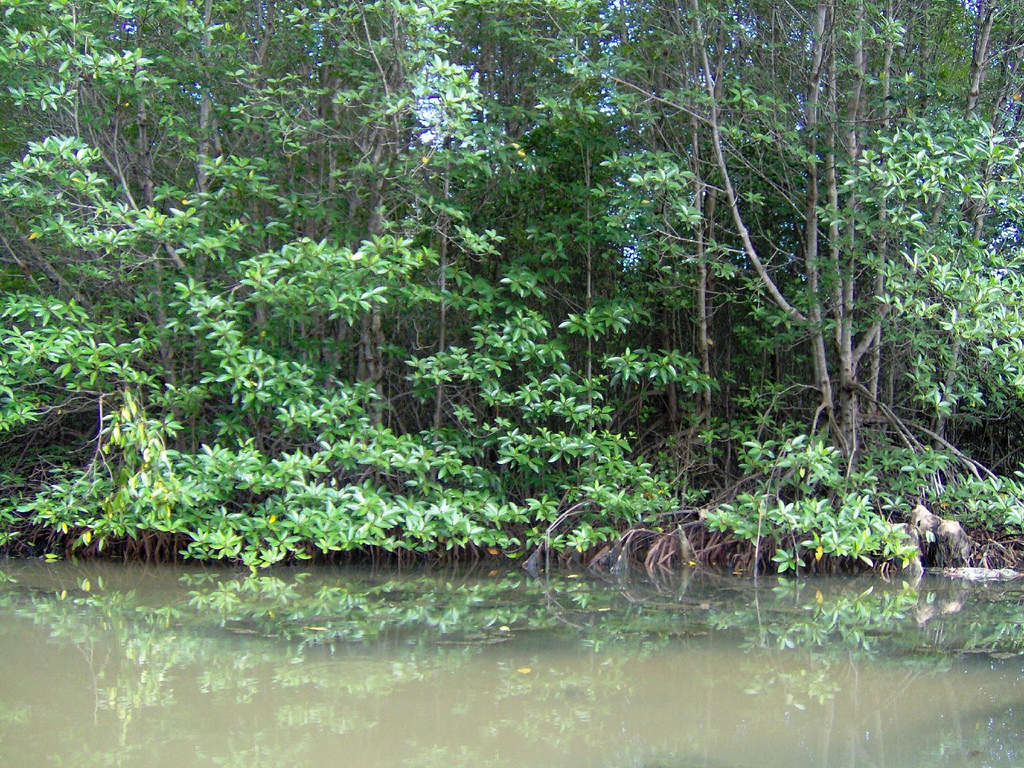
Cần Giờ Mangrove Forest near Ho Chi Minh, Vietnam.

In Vietnam, mangrove forests grow along the southern coast, including two forests: the Cần Giờ Mangrove Forest biosphere reserve and the U Minh mangrove forest in the sea and coastal region of Kiên Giang, Cà Mau and Bạc Liêu provinces. The mangrove forests of the Bay of Kompong Som (maki) in Cambodia are of major ecological and cultural importance, as the human population relies heavily on the crabs and fish that live in the roots.

=== Middle East ===
==== Arabian Peninsula ====
The wide and shallow shelf on Yemen's Red Sea coast consists of unconsolidated sediments, which support 11 species of seagrasses up to 500 m (1,600 ft) offshore on the shoreward side of sand spits, islands and reefs. Fragmented mangrove patches cover around 30–50 km^{2} (12–19 mi^{2}) along the coast (100–200 m (330–660 ft) wide along a 122 km (76 mi) stretch). The mangrove forest of Kamaran island was logged in the early 20th century, and the timber used for construction in Aden.

The mangrove forests along the shoreline of the United Arab Emirates are an integral part of its coastal ecosystem. The Environment Agency – Abu Dhabi (EAD) is currently working on rehabilitation, conservation and protection of mangrove forests in seven key sites in Abu Dhabi including: Saadiyat Island, Jubail Island, Marawah Marine Biosphere Reserve (which also comprises Bu Tinah Island), Bu Sayeef Protected Area, Ras Gharab, the Eastern Corniche and Ras Ghanada.

Oman supports large areas of mangroves near Muscat, in particular at Shinas, Qurm Park and Mahout Island. In Arabic, mangrove trees are known as qurm (قُرْم), thus the mangrove area in Oman is known as Qurm Park.

Mangroves are found in seven regions in the Kingdom of Bahrain: Arad Bay Reserve, Tubli Bay Reserve, Nabih Saleh, Sitra Island and Aker, Ras Sanad, Sitra Industrial Area, Ras Hayyan. To help preserve and strengthen the coastline, Bahrain committed at COP26 to quadruple its mangrove trees by 2035, increasing their number from 400,000 to 1.6 million. The initiative aims to protect and restore 15 million hectares of mangroves by 2030.

==== Iran ====
Mangrove forests are present in Iran between 25°11′N to 27°52′N, in the northern parts of the Persian Gulf and Sea of Oman. Pockets of the biome extend (from southwest to southeast) along the shores of the maritime provinces Bushehr, Hormozgan, and Sistan and Balouchestan. Forests on and near the island of Qeshm in the Persian Gulf are dominated by the species Avicennia marina, known locally as the "hara" or "harra" tree, and cover an area of approximately 20 km^{2} (7.7 mi^{2}). This area is protected as the UNESCO Hara Biosphere Reserve, where commercial use is restricted to fishing (mainly shrimp), tourist boat trips, and limited mangrove cutting for animal feed.

==== South Asia ====
===== India =====
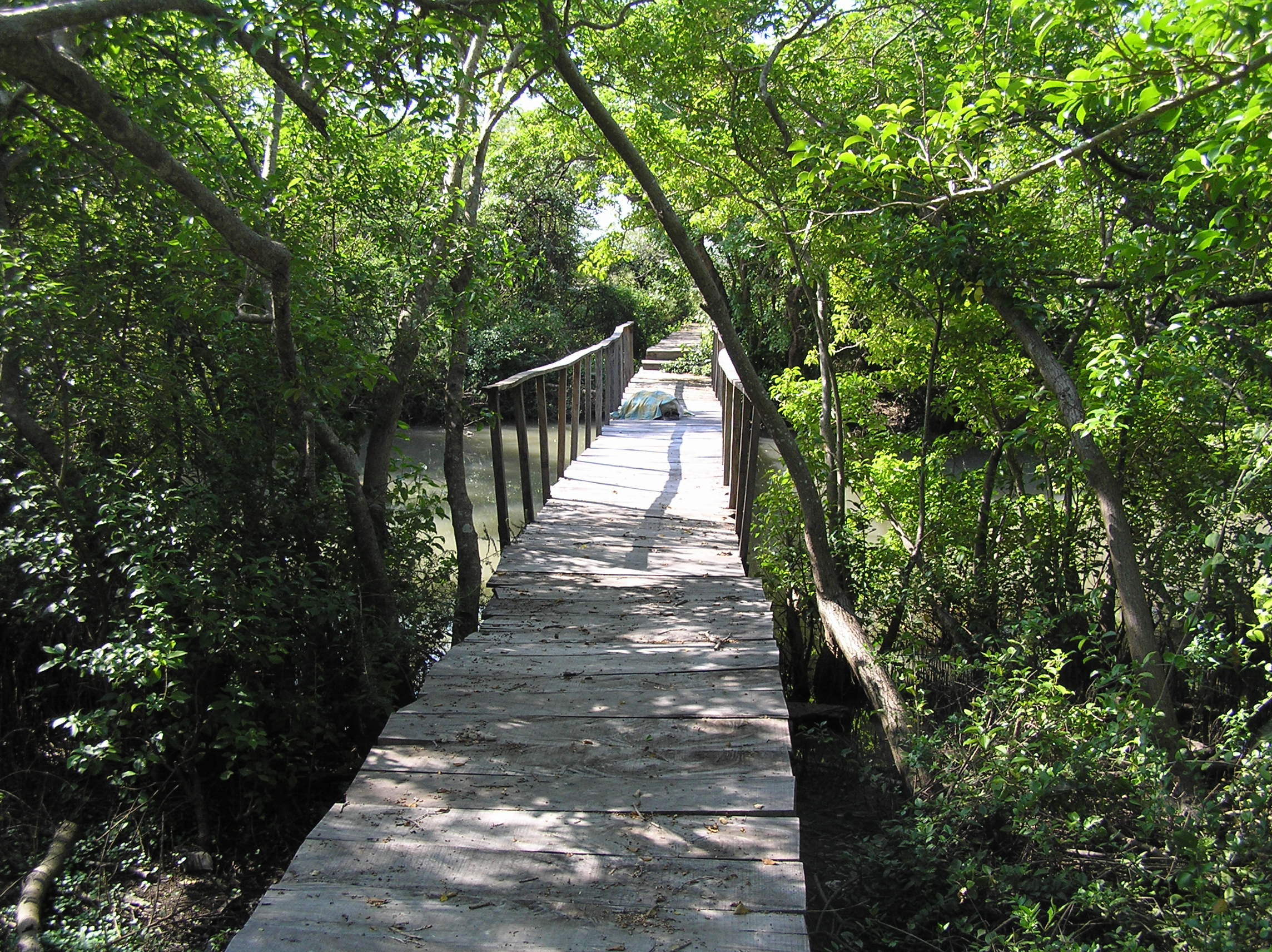
Mangroves in Muthupet Lagoon in the Kaveri River delta in eastern India.

As per the ISFR 2017 report, the total area of mangrove cover of India is 4,921 km^{2} (1,900 mi^{2}), (181 km^{2} (70 mi^{2}) positively changed with respect to 2015 mangrove cover assessment) which contributes 3.3% to the global mangrove cover. The deltas of the Ganges, Mahanadi, Krishna, Godavari, and Kaveri rivers contain mangrove forests. Backwaters in Kerala have high density of mangrove forest on the shores. Indian mangroves consist of 46 species (4 of which are natural hybrids) belonging to 22 genera and 14 families, representing about 57% of the world's mangrove species.

The following table shows the prevalence of mangroves in the states of India and the total area covered by them in square kilometers.

Rank	States/UTs with highest mangrove cover in 2017	Total mangrove cover in km^{2} in 2015	2017
1	West Bengal	2,106	2114
2	Gujarat	1,107	1140
3	Andaman And Nicobar Islands	617	617
4	Andhra Pradesh	367	404
5	Maharashtra	222	304
6	Odisha	231	243
7	Tamil Nadu	47	49
8	Goa	26	26
9	Kerala	9	9
10	Karnataka	3	10

The Pichavaram mangroves in Tamil Nadu is India's one of the largest mangrove forests. The Bhitarkanika Mangroves Forest of Odisha, by the Bay of Bengal, is India's second largest mangrove forest. Other major mangals occur on the Andaman and Nicobar Islands and the Gulf of Kutch in Gujarat.

====== Baratang Island ======
The Baratang Island mangroves are located within the Andaman and Nicobar Islands. The mangrove swamps of Baratang Island are situated between Middle and South Andaman Island.

====== Bhitarkanika ======
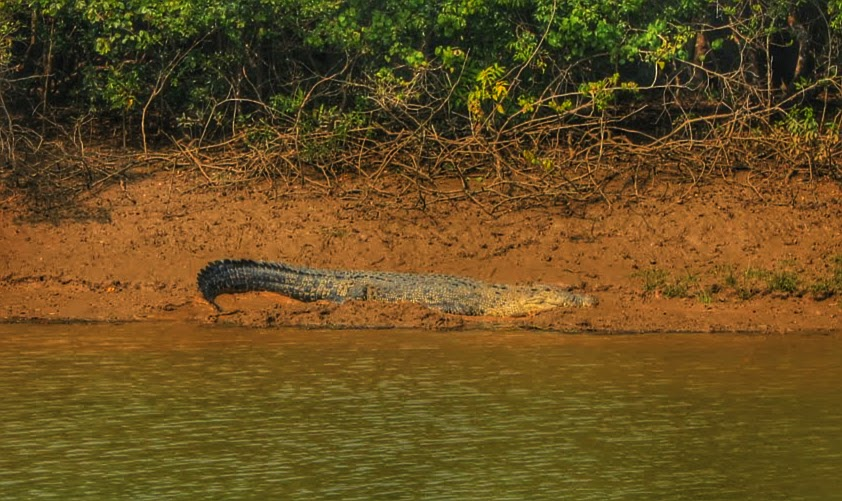
Saltwater crocodile in the Bhitarkanika Mangroves of Odisha, India.

The Bhitarkanika mangroves form India's second largest forest, located in the state of Odisha. Bhitarkanika is created by the two river deltas of Brahmani and Baitarani river and one of the important Ramsar Wetland in India. It is also the home of saltwater crocodiles and nesting olive ridley sea turtles.

====== Godavari-Krishna ======
The Godavari-Krishna mangroves lie in the delta of the Godavari and Krishna rivers in the state of Andhra Pradesh. Mangroves ecoregion is under protection for Calimere Wildlife and Pulicat Lake Bird Sanctuary.

====== Mumbai ======
The megacity Mumbai has mangroves on its coastline along the west coast of India. A total of 10 mangrove species were reported in this area, dominated by Avicennia marina. These mangroves support a rich diversity of life forms, especially molluscs. The mangrove area in Mumbai City District is 2 km^{2}, and in Mumbai Suburban District is 64 km^{2}. Mumbai's single largest mangrove belt is the western bank of Thane Creek. The Government of Maharashtra has declared much of the area on the western bank of Thane Creek as the Thane Creek Flamingo Sanctuary. Mangrove areas on the government lands are governed by the Maharashtra Forest Department. An extensive area of mangroves on the private lands in Vikhroli has been conserved by Soonabai Pirojsha Godrej Marine Ecology Centre, Vikhroli, Mumbai.

====== Pichavaram ======
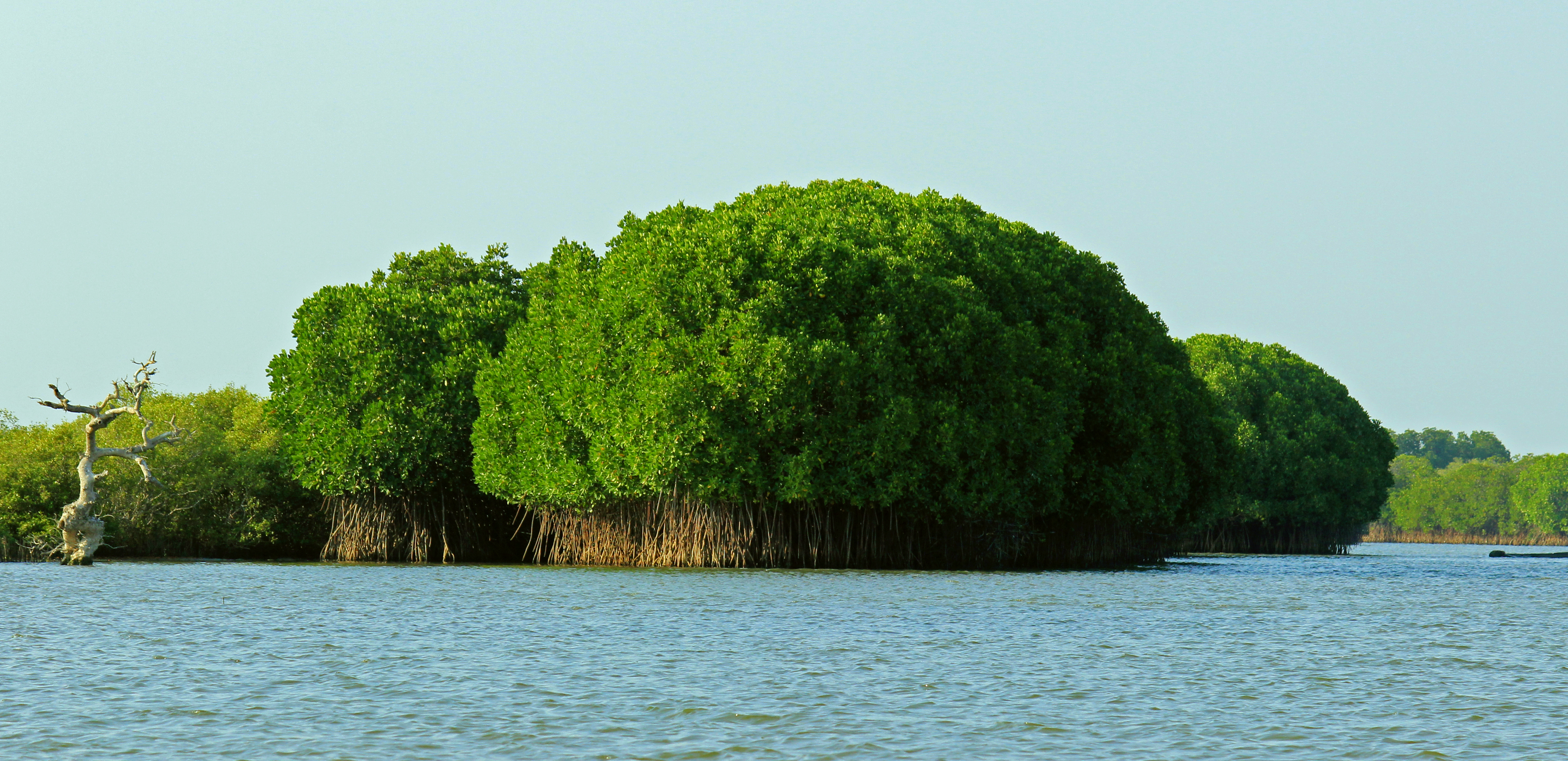
Pichavaram mangrove forests in India.

The Pichavaram mangroves are situated at Pichavaram near Chidambaram in the state of Tamil Nadu. Pichavaram ranks amongst the most exquisite scenic spots in Tamil Nadu and has many species of aquatic birds.

====== Sundarbans ======
Map showing Sundarbans in Bay of Bengal.

The Sundarbans in the Ganges–Brahmaputra delta extend from the Hooghly River in West Bengal to the Baleswar River in Bangladesh, covering an area of about 10,000 km^{2} (3,900 sq mi). This area comprises closed and open mangrove forests, agriculturally used land, mudflats and barren land. It is intersected by tidal streams and channels. Four protected areas in the Sundarbans, viz Sundarbans National Park, Sundarbans West, Sundarbans South and Sundarbans East Wildlife Sanctuaries are enlisted as UNESCO World Heritage Sites. Biodiversity includes at least 27 mangrove species, 40 mammal, 35 reptile and 260 bird species. More than 2.5 million people are estimated to live in the vicinity of the Sundarbans, making them one of the world's most densely populated areas.

It is the largest mangrove region and the largest single block of tidal halophytic mangrove forest in the world. Sundri (Heritiera fomes) trees provide durable hard timber. Palm, coconut, keora, agar, also grow in some parts of the delta. India's mangrove forests are habitat for saltwater crocodile (Crocodylus porosus), turtles, and snakes. This region is part of the Great Sundarbans and covers a National Park, Tiger reserve and a Biosphere Reserve.

Sundarbans was designated a Ramsar site on May 21, 1992. The fertile soils of the delta have been subject to intensive human use for centuries, and the ecoregion has been mostly converted to intensive agriculture, with few enclaves of forest remaining. The remaining forests, together with the Sundarbans mangroves, are important habitat for the endangered tiger. Additionally, the Sundarbans serves a crucial function as a protective flood barrier for the millions of inhabitants in and around Kolkata against the result of cyclone activity. Sundarbans is home to many different species of birds, mammals, insects, reptiles and fish. It is estimated that there may be found more than 120 species of fish and over 260 species of birds and more than fifty species of reptiles and eight amphibians.

===== Maldives =====
Mangroves occur in certain muddy swampy islands of Maldives.

===== Pakistan =====
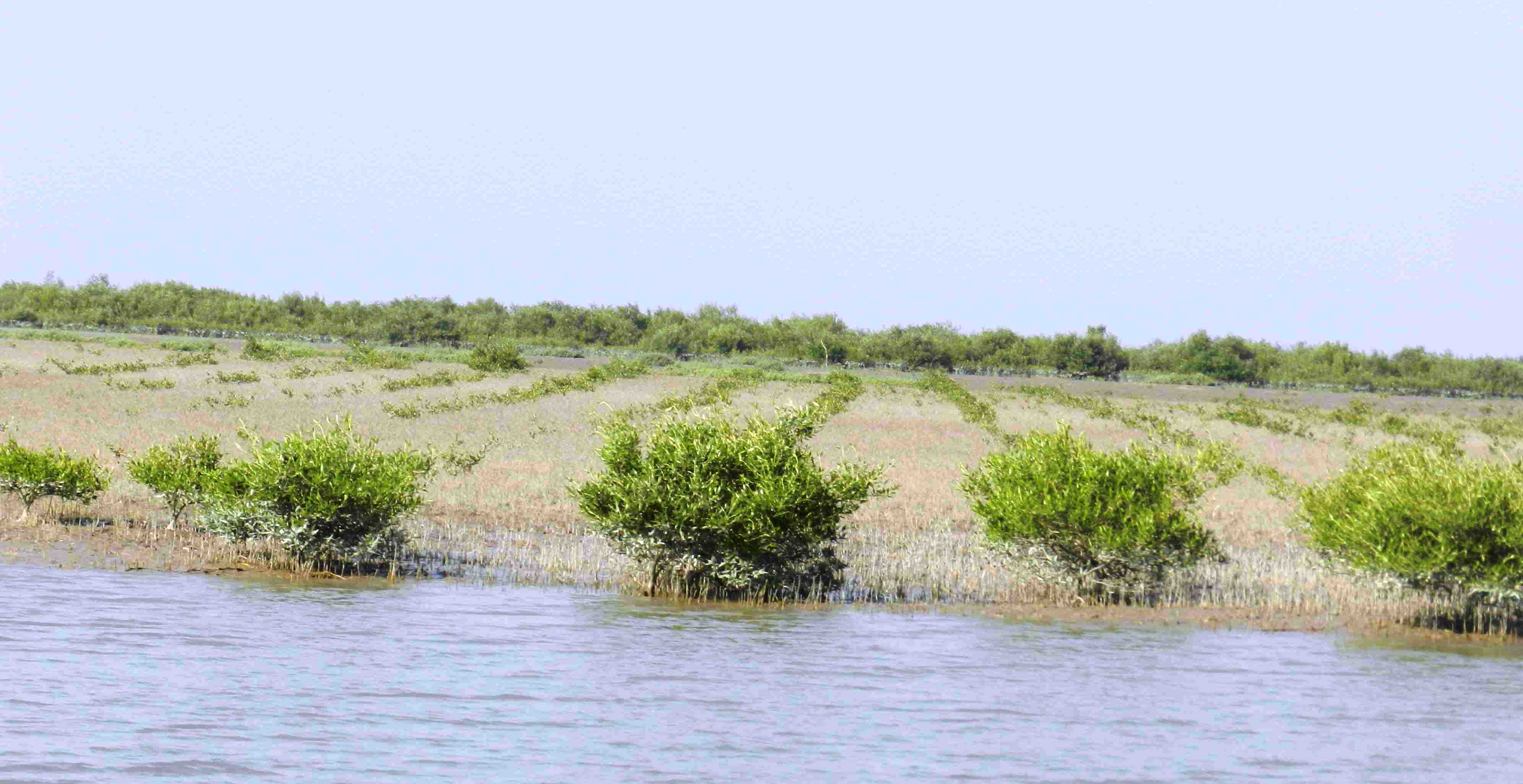
New mangrove plantation, Shah Bundar, Sujawal, Pakistan.

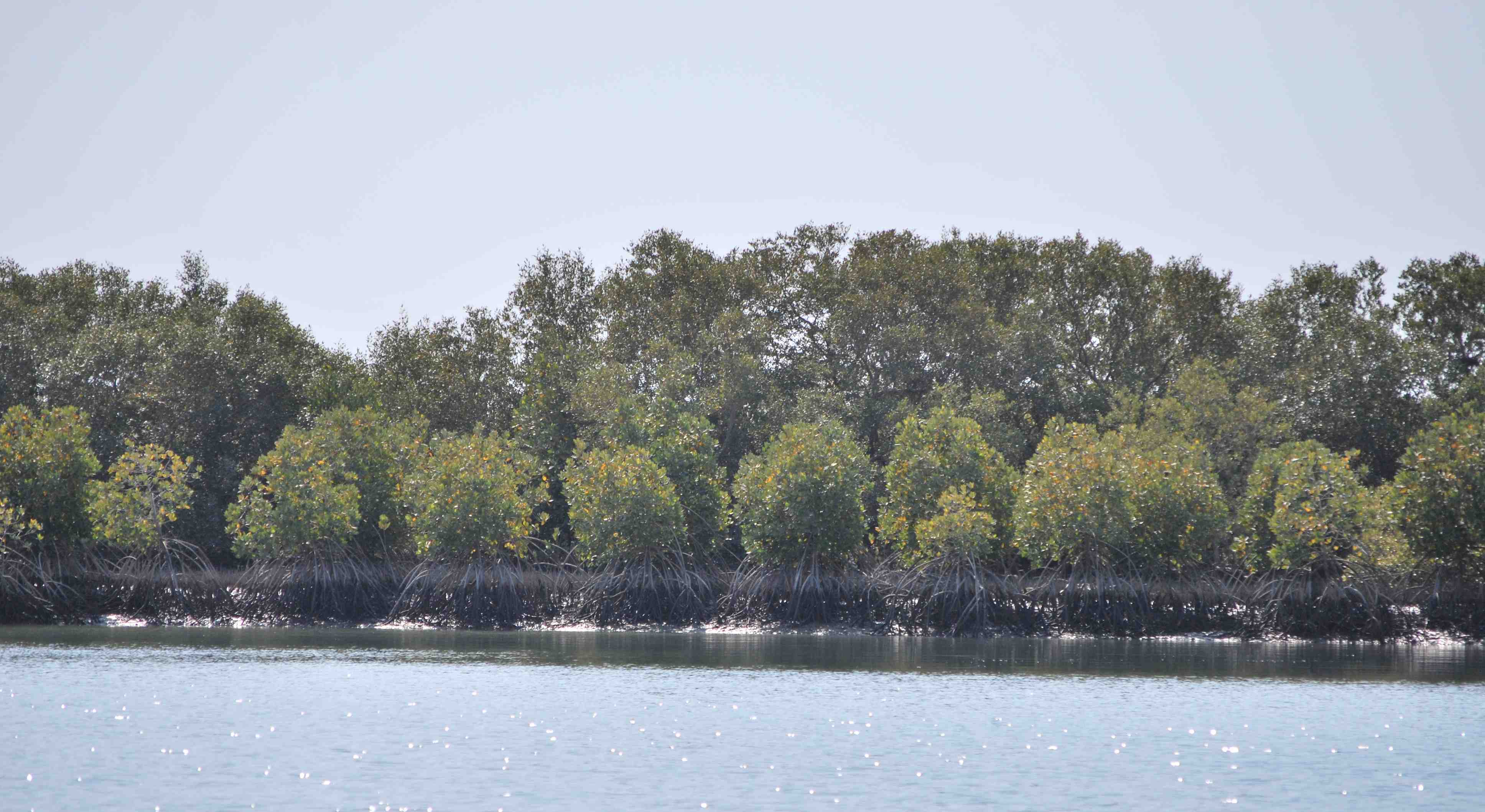
Flourishing mangroves along Karachi coast, Pakistan.

Pakistani mangroves are located mainly along the delta of the Indus River (the Indus River Delta-Arabian Sea mangroves ecoregion). Major mangrove forests are found on the coastline of the provinces of Sindh and Balochistan.

In Karachi, land reclamation projects have led to the cutting down of mangrove forests for commercial and urban development. On 22 June 2013, Sindh Forest Department, Govt. of Sindh, Pakistan, with the help of 300 local coastal volunteer planters set the Guinness World Record by planting 847,250 mangrove saplings at Kharo Chan, Thatta, Sindh, Pakistan in a little over 12 hours. This is the highest number of saplings planted within a day under the Guinness World Record category of "Maximum Number of Trees Planted in a Day".

Sindh Forest Department, Government of Sindh Mangrove has played pioneer role for the conservation and protection of the mangroves in the Indus Delta since late 1950s when it was handed over the areas. A breakthrough success is the re-introduction of Rhizophora mucronata into the Indus Delta, which had become extinct there. More recently, a threatened mangrove shrub, Ceriops tagal, has also been successfully re-introduced. A third species, Aegiceras corniculatum, is under trials at the nursery stage.

A major initiative is currently underway in Sindh to rehabilitate degraded mangrove mudflats. Since 2010 alone, around 550 km^{2} (210 mi^{2}) of former mangrove forest have been planted and rehabilitated. During this period, through concerted efforts and a rigorous conservation policy adopted by the Sindh Forest Department, the government of Sindh and the federal government, a mangrove resource base of around 1,500 km^{2} (580 mi^{2}) has been created, with the support of local coastal communities. International organizations like IUCN and WWF are also playing critical role to support this initiative. Other achievements include: (1) Declaring all the mangrove forests in the Indus Delta as Protected Forests in December 2010; Constitution of a Mangrove Conservation Committee at the provincial level which includes all stakeholders as members and overall awareness of the importance of mangroves and its ecosystem.

=== Oceania ===
==== Australia and New Guinea ====
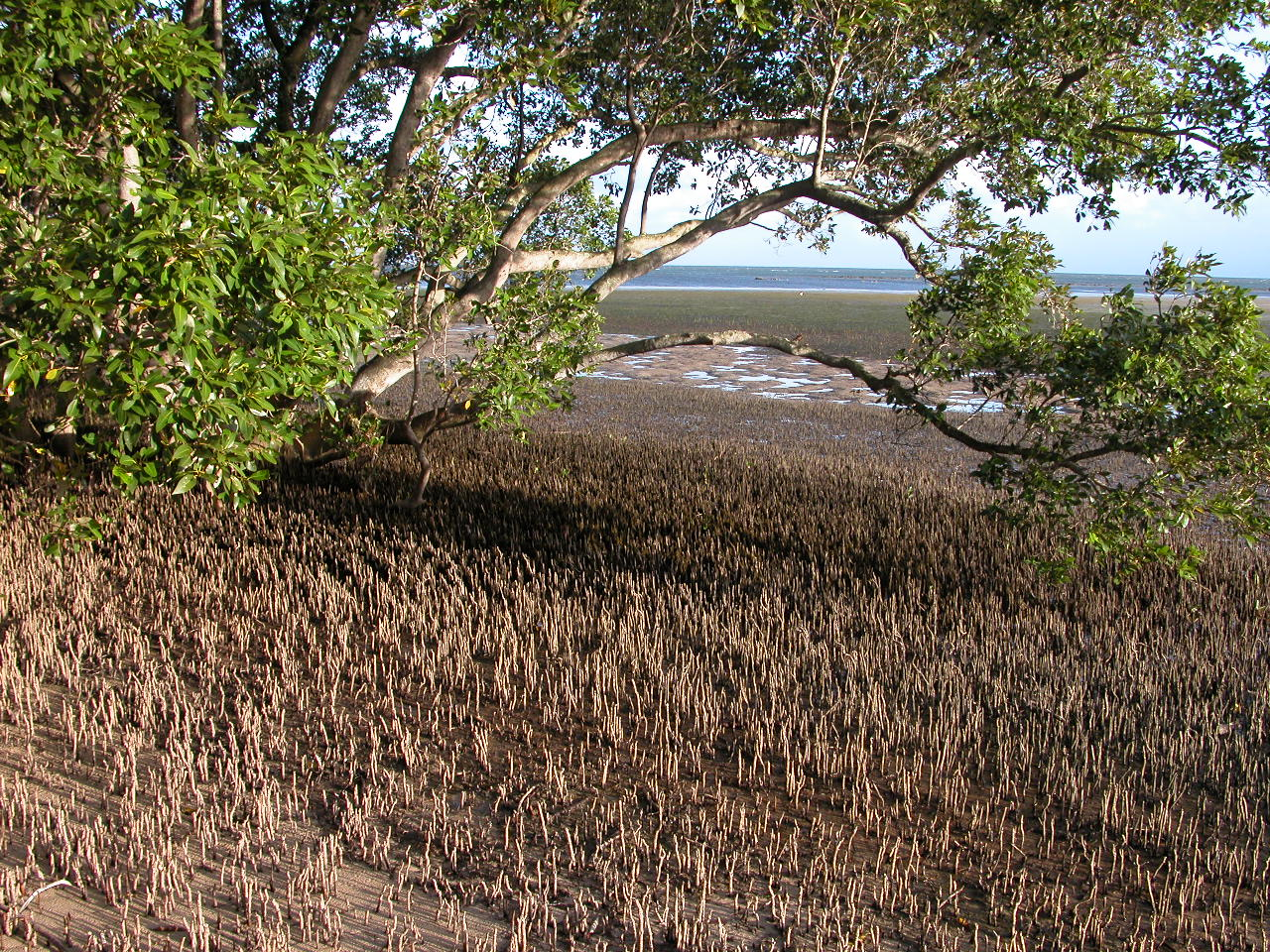
A mangrove tree surrounded by its pneumatophores, in Moreton Bay, Queensland, Australia.

Australia and Papua New Guinea both rank in the top five mangrove holding nations globally. More than five species of Rhizophoraceae grow in Australasia, with particularly high biodiversity on the island of New Guinea and northern Australia.

As of 2012, Australia has slightly below 10,000 km^{2} (3,900 mi^{2}) of mangroves and Papua New Guinea has just under approximately 5,000 km^{2} (1,900 mi^{2}) ±12% (CI 0.9, n = 7) of mangrove.

==== New Zealand ====
New Zealand also has mangrove forests extending to around 38°S (similar to Australia's latitudinal limit): the southernmost examples are at Raglan Harbour (37°48′S) on the west coast and Ohiwa Harbour (near Ōpōtiki, 38°00′S) on the east coast. Avicennia marina australasica is the only mangrove in New Zealand.

==== Pacific Islands ====
Twenty-five species of mangrove are found on various Pacific islands, with extensive mangrove forests on some. Mangroves on Guam, Palau, Kosrae and Yap have been badly affected by development.

Mangroves are not native to Hawaii, but the red and oriental mangroves have been introduced and are now naturalized. Both species are considered invasive and classified as pests by the University of Hawaii Botany Department.

== Mangrove declines ==
=== Global trends ===
In the last five decades, worldwide mangrove area has fallen across all regions. Different data sources or survey methods make estimates more problematic, as many nations have high variations of mangrove change.

Percentage of original area lost per year

- Asia: 1.52%
- Africa: 1.25%
- Australia: 1.99%
- Americas: 3.62%
- The World: 2.07%

(based on data from) (Annual loss rates calculated from the mean number of years between original area and present area for each region: 24, 25, 7, 11, and 17 years for Asia, Africa, Australia, the Americas, and the world, respectively.)

Mangroves on a global scale have declined from 136,798 km^2 in 2000 to 135,882 km^2 in 2016. Between this period from 2000 to 2016 there was an average annual rate of decline of 0.13%. From 2000 to 2012, the global mangrove deforestation rate fluctuated between 0.16% and 0.39% annually. The most recent and comprehensive global assessment of mangrove distribution was conducted by Hamilton and Casey (2016) and provides a high-resolution global database of mangrove loss at the 1 arc-second level at annual intervals from 2000 to 2012 with estimates for 2013 and 2014. In the 1980s and 1990s the greatest amount of loss occurred, while in the period of 2000 to 2005 the rate has fallen significantly across all regions. Some projections estimate that worldwide mangrove area will decline by a further 25% by 2025, particularly in developing nations. It is estimated that since 1970, 28% of mangrove lost has been directly displaced by commercial aquaculture. At large, it has been suggested that almost one quarter of the globes original mangrove cover has been destroyed due to human activity. More than 90% of the worlds mangroves reside in developing countries, thus these communities see the most consequences.

=== Role of perception ===
People's perception of mangrove ecosystems has been instrumental in the loss of mangroves. Commonly, they have been undervalued and considered 'wastelands' with low productivity (,). The worth of an ecosystem is largely determined by humans based on the services or resources that the land can give to us. This definition of worth ignores the mental and emotional services that ecosystems can provide as well. Concerns for the fate of mangroves have thus historically been restricted to scientific communities, with little transfer of knowledge to local communities and governments. Mangroves are a common pool resource, creating difficulties in enforcing restrictions on exploitative activities.

==== Global Perception ====
Across the globe we can see the prioritization of economic growth over the maintenance and conservation of natural ecosystems. Globally, aquaculture shrimp farming, a lead cause of mangrove deforestation, has been promoted as a way to promote development by allowing the underdeveloped countries where these ecosystems reside to obtain foreign exchange earnings and reimburse external debts. Promoting this growth of aquaculture are multinational corporations, national governments, and international development agencies based on the stance that shrimp farming can benefit the worlds food supply and support the economies in poorer coastal communities through employment opportunities. This represents an economic trend that favors export-oriented products often from monocultures, with the goal being poverty reduction and increased food security, over the health of the land. There has been an increase in studies regarding export-oriented production that has started to reveal that these economic systems work against the livelihood and stability of local communities. As this global perception shifts, a priority on sustainable export-oriented production has been established.

==== Local Community Perception ====
Among the local communities affected are the indigenous ancestral communities who depend on the mangrove ecosystems for their livelihood. These communities have slowly been given permission to maintain the mangrove ecosystem given their long history of maintenance and care. We can see this in Ecuador where perceptions have shifted to grant access and control of forests within ancestral communities to lead in maintaining the health of these forests. The declining rate of mangrove loss since 2000 across all regions is indicative of this, bringing forth an increasing number of conservation projects and legislation.

Mangrove forests support emotional, cultural, and social well-being for local communities. They have been considered a CES, or a Cultural Ecosystem Service, meaning that they contribute to peoples wellbeing from their physical health to their emotional health. Local people in Ecuador perceive mangrove forests as 'like a friend'. This is because local people often place importance on their personal relationship to the land and how it impacts their identity and belonging; along with how their heritage and history is tied to the land. Using new information technology like Geographic Information Systems have helped activists push for better environmental protection and helped with social advocacy.

=== Causes of decline ===
A variety of factors have led to the declining trends in mangrove distribution (refer to table fig of causes). These factors are predominantly anthropogenic in origin, as mangrove destruction is positively correlated to human population density. Up to 35% of mangrove forests worldwide have been lost since 1980, reflecting the increased pressure from high population densities residing at the coast. Mangrove losses to climate change are considered a probable long term threat to future distribution. Despite a wide variety of factors linked to mangrove loss (insert figure of causes), the main drivers of recent (i.e. after 1980) mangrove destruction are linked to four main activities: urban sprawl, tourism, agriculture and aquaculture. The causes of declines in mangrove areas vary between regions. In Asia, the Caribbean and Latin America, aquaculture and tourism development are the greatest threat. In Oceania, tourism development is the greatest threat while in Africa, conversion of mangroves for agricultural and urban development is most apparent. At large, the largest contributor to mangrove forest loss is the conversion of land to aquaculture, agriculture, or urban land.

Aquaculture – This activity is considered the greatest contributor to worldwide mangrove loss. Since the 1980s, shrimp aquaculture dramatically increased, replacing mangroves with ponds and degrading surrounding areas with associated pollution. Aquaculture grew rapidly among subtropical and tropical lowlands due to an increased global demand for shrimp. Aquaculture has dramatically affected some regions. For example, 50–80% of mangroves were lost in Asia in the past decades. Asia, the Caribbean and Latin America have been most affected by aquaculture. Aquaculture involves other resource demands as well given the need for feed, seed, and water in order for the farms to function. Studies are beginning to show that aquaculture is one of the food production systems with the highest use of resources, leading to the stance that aquaculture is unsustainable.

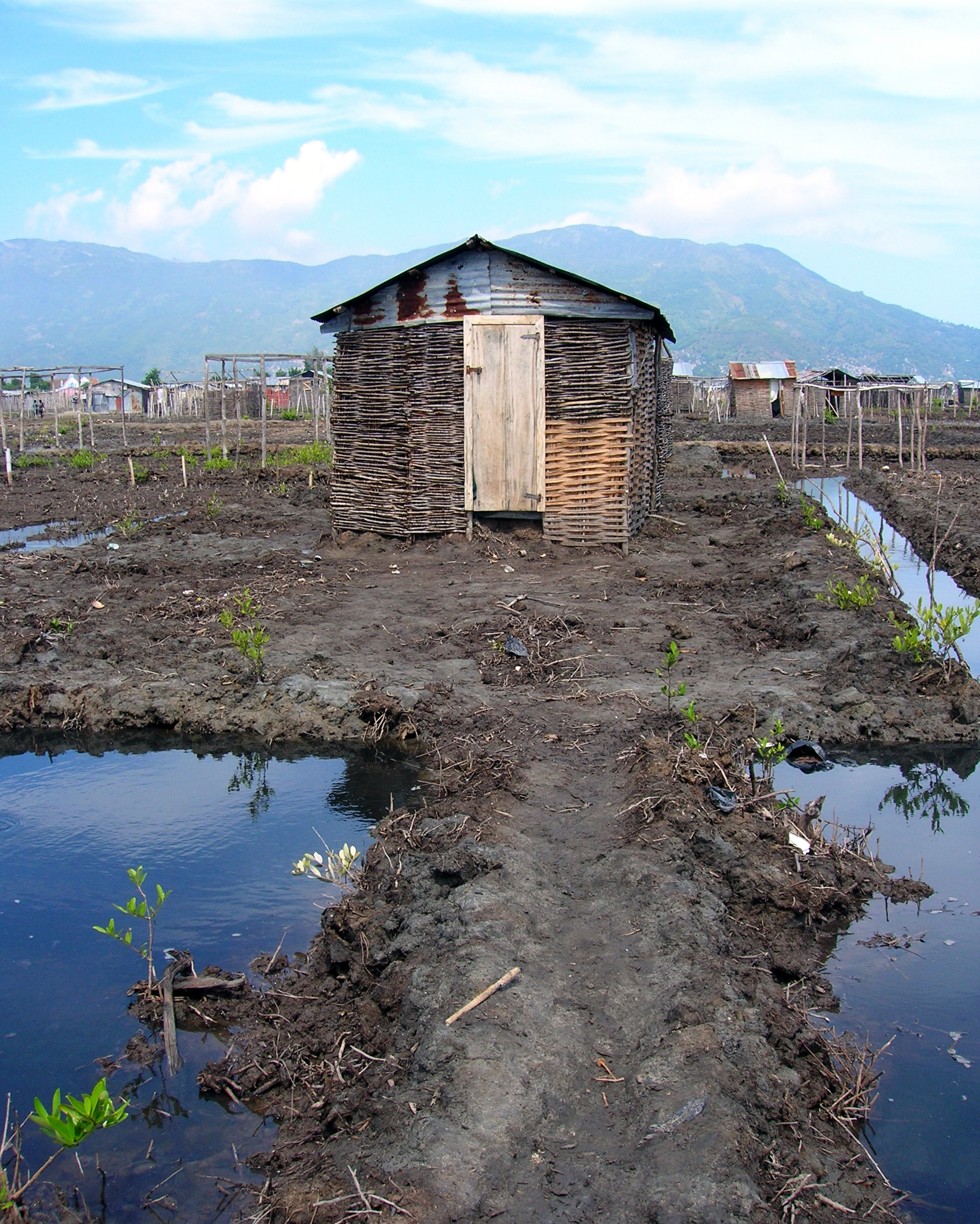
Urban expansion – Urban development on mangrove habitat in Cap-Haïtien, Haiti.

Urban expansion – As population density increases at the coast, areas of mangrove forest have been replaced to provide urban and industrial lands.

Tourism – infrastructure supporting tourism often requires the reclamation of substantial tracts of mangrove forests. In the Americas and Oceania, tourism is a major driver of mangrove loss. Where tourism is a main contributor to an economy (such as Pacific Island nations), construction of resorts and related infrastructures have reduced mangrove area in past decades.

Agriculture – Conversion of mangrove forests for agriculture has occurred across all regions historically, freeing up land for activities such as rice or salt production.

Charcoal: As of 2019 in Myanmar, the cutting down of mangroves to turn into charcoal for sale in China and Thailand continues unabated. In Ecuador mangroves have also been used for timber, tannins, and charcoal.

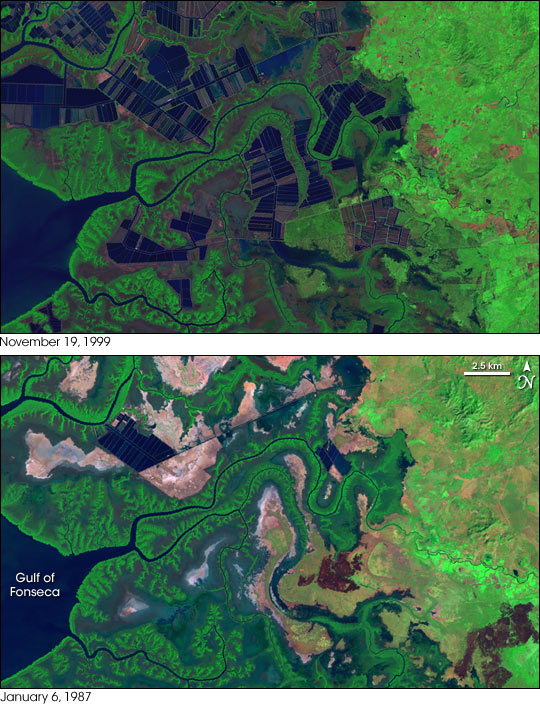
Shrimp farming development in Honduras. Lower image is before development in 1987, upper image is following expansion of ponds in 1999.

==== Mangrove loss case study: shrimp aquaculture in South-east Asia ====
In many South-east Asian nations, shrimp aquaculture has been instrumental in mangrove loss, particularly in the 1980s and 1990s. Due to high economic returns, shrimp farming was promoted to improve economic conditions in many countries. The social and economic benefits of shrimp farming are substantial. Shrimp farms are located close to the coast to reduce costs by using tidal energy and short canal lengths to the coast. Consequently, vast tracts of mangrove forest have been replaced by numerous ponds. Compounding mangrove losses is the short life span of individual ponds (5–10 years), imposing a shifting cultivation pattern to shrimp farming.

After 1980, shrimp farming became far more intensive, with high productivity (per unit area) ponds proliferating across the landscape. Dramatic reductions in mangrove forests were reported with shrimp pond intensification. In Thailand, mangrove forests literally halved between 1975 and 1993. The impact of such losses has been linked to the disruption of ecological and economic functioning of mangroves. For example, loss of income for local Thai fishermen has been reported due to reduced catches from the degradation of juvenile fish habitat. Some consider that the number of shrimp farms in South-east Asia peaked in the late 1990s, with the rate of mangrove loss declining accordingly. This decline is in part due to increased conservation and restoration projects, and improved management practices.

=== Global climate change and mangrove loss ===
Increases in temperature, CO_{2}, precipitation, storms, and sea level are likely to threaten mangroves in the future. Other concerns tied with climate change are drought and changing ocean-climate cycles as they effect erosion which is a key factor in mangrove deforestation. Sea level rise is considered the greatest climate change related threat to mangrove regions. The natural ability of mangroves to 'keep up' with rising sea level through peat or sediment accumulation could be exceeded, leading to mangrove die back. Low island mangroves are most at risk, as demonstrated in Bermuda, where sea level rise has exceeded peat accumulation rates periodically, resulting in landward die back of mangrove stands. Climate change may reduce global mangrove area by 10–15%, but it is a long term, less significance threat to the current 1–2% annual loss from human activities.

=== Consequences of Mangrove Loss ===
Mangroves are essential for environmental sustainability and the livelihood of coastal communities through the creation of protection, biodiversity, and carbon storage. The global decline of mangrove forest cover has led to numerous impacts on both the environment and also on the local coastal communities. Regarding the environment, decline in mangrove land cover has led to reduced coastal protection, reduce carbon sequestration capacity while simultaneously increasing greenhouse gas emissions, decreased nutrient cycling, and threatens the livelihood of species that depend on them for habitat. Regarding communities, the decline in mangrove forests has led to the loss of property, lives, and infrastructure and has caused increased social conflict.

== Mangrove expansions ==
=== Global trends ===
The history of mass mangrove deforestation and the increasing risks of climate change have led to an emphasis on the importance of restoring mangroves and other coastal wetlands globally. Several nations have experienced an expansion of their mangrove area. These expansions include human activities promoting seaward or landward expansion from climatic or other local factors, as well as conservation and reforestation programs. Globally, this stability and expansion is far outweighed by the magnitude of mangrove loss from human activities. Although restored mangroves do not provide the full ecosystem functions as natural mangroves do, mangrove restoration still holds potential to benefit biodiversity conservation, climate change mitigation, and sustainable development goals.

=== Seaward expansion and human activity ===
Seaward mangrove expansion is considered a natural response to high inputs of sediment and nutrients from human activity in adjacent catchments;. Mangroves naturally encourage sediment deposition by slowing currents and attenuating waves. However, with high sediment inputs, the elevation of intertidal flats can rise above the low tide limit of the original mangrove forest, resulting in a seaward expansion of new mangrove habitat. Once new mangroves establish, they too begin to trap more sediment, raising the tidal flat elevation and generating more mangrove habitat. Seaward expansions are likely in regions with modified catchments (i.e. deforestation or urban development) with high topography where high sediments loads are delivered to mangroves at the coast. Extremely high rates of sediment input can exceed tolerance thresholds and induce mangrove die backs. Excess sedimentation is the primary control, but nutrients (i.e. from agricultural runoff) can enhance mangrove expansion, particularly when combined with high levels of sedimentation. Seaward expansions highlight the interconnectivity of mangrove ecosystems to adjacent catchments and the need to consider catchment alteration when managing mangroves.

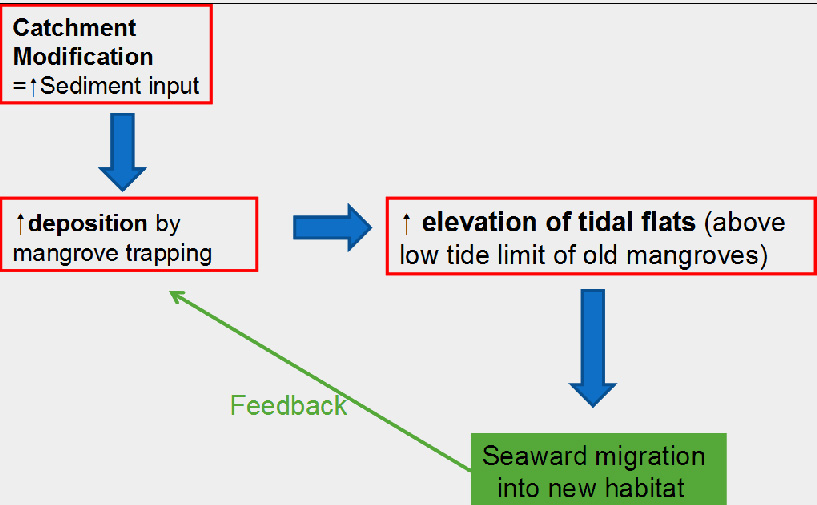
Conceptual model of seaward mangrove migrations.

==== Case study: New Zealand mangroves ====
In New Zealand (NZ), temperate mangroves (Avicennia marina) are common in estuaries, harbours and tidal creeks north of 38° latitude. Following European colonization, mangrove area declined, but since the 1970s rapid, ongoing seaward expansion has occurred in many areas. For example, in the last 50 years mangrove area has expanded 120% in Tuaranga Harbour. Such expansion is strongly correlated with elevated rates of sediment deposition. Catchment activities such as deforestation and more recently, urban development have been blamed for the expansion.

Considerable debate over whether to protect or remove NZ mangroves exist. Proponents for protection cite the ecological and coastal protection values of mangrove stands, while removal advocates aim to restore recreational values and prevent encroachment into non-mangrove ecosystems. A shift in the management strategy of regional councils from protection to mangrove 'management' has occurred recently Removals may take place when human amenities or non-mangrove habitats are deemed threatened by mangrove encroachment. Some researchers caution comparisons being made between NZ and tropical mangroves, suggesting NZ mangroves are unique in their ecology and require a tailored management approach.

=== Landward expansion ===
In contrast to seaward expansions in NZ, landward expansions are documented in a number of regions (Thailand, Australia, and Hawaii). The cause of landward expansions is not always clear. In Eastern Australia expansions have replaced salt marshes with various suggestions for the cause of landward expansion (increased rainfall, changes in hydrology, to local subsidence). Expansions in Hawaii are thought to be the result of invasions by exotic mangrove species.

=== Expansion through conservation and restoration ===
More recently, awareness of the economic, social, and ecological values of mangroves have led to an increase in the number of initiatives to protect and restore mangrove areas. Broader recognition of the connection of mangroves to coastal food chains, coastal protection and socio-economic welfare has driven recent conservation. For example, Bangladesh has undertaken extensive coastal afforestation (mass plantings) projects since 1966, leading to an increase in mangrove area in recent decades; 2005. Many nations with mangroves have signed on to the 1971 Ramsar Convention on wetlands in the last two decades, making a commitment to wetland preservation. However, the adoption of protective legislation is not evenly spread. For instance, community initiatives to protect mangroves are common in Africa but little legislation exists compared to other regions, such as Asia. Despite the challenges, over the past 40 years there have been nearly 2000 km^2 of mangrove land cover that have been replanted.

==== Case Study: Ecuador Mangroves ====
Aquaculture began in Ecuador in 1969, and within the first 15 years, nearly 90,000 hectares of industrial shrimp farms were built. Starting in the 1990's, mangrove expansion began to slow down and started expanding in return. A mangrove reforestation project started in 2008 along with an order for aquaculture industrial shrimp farms to conduct reforestation with their own funds if they had in the past cut down mangroves. After 4 years, in 2012, 1,419 hectares of mangroves had been reforested. A survey from 2016 found that 83% of farms had already fulfilled their reforestation requirement, with others still in the process.

=== Poleward Expansion ===
Poleward expansion of mangrove species has been observed on many coast lines in the world including US East and West coast, as well as Australia. This is arguably related to climate change. Average lowest temperatures have been increasing due to climate change, and this trend allows the survival of propagules during winter and germinate in warmer seasons. In areas that were too cold for mangrove species to grow, mangrove's survival could results in invasive species. In New South Wales in Australia, area coverage of salt marsh has declined due to poleward expansion of mangrove species.

== Challenges, limitations and future suggestions ==
Much attention has been given to mangroves by the scientific community, as well as a largely universal acknowledgement among communities and governments of the ecological and economic values. Despite this awareness, global mangrove area continues to decline through human activities. A lack of communication between biologists, effected residents, and governments could partly account for this.

Local communities have largely taken on mangrove restoration into their own hands. There have been positive examples of community managed mangrove protection in Thailand, Indonesia. the Philippines, and Cambodia. Ancestral communities have long protected their land without any government support, as conservation becomes more difficult as mangroves continue to be destroyed, external support from the government becomes more important. Placing management control in the hands of the locals must include recognition of ancestral territory land and accompanying stewardship rights. It also thus requires an increase in collaboration and communication between governments and local communities. Gaps in governmental regulation have appeared in monitoring, coordination, and enforcement efforts. For example, in Ecuador, the protection of mangroves have not had consistent and dependable support from the government thus making protection initiatives more difficult to implement.

Calls have been made for greater collaboration between international researchers and residents of affected nations. Efforts to assess changes in worldwide mangrove distribution have been hindered by a lack of long term data, or limited to no data at all for some nations. This lack of data creates holes effecting the traceability, coordination, and enforcement ability of researchers. Without accurate data on distributions, an accurate forecast of mangrove loss or expansion becomes problematic. This in turn may hinder the progress of conservation projects. This data becomes more important as threats such as pollution and climate change increase, requiring closer collaboration between ancestral communities, the scientific community, and government regulation policies.

Despite large volumes of scientific literature on mangroves, many uncertainties still exist. These include how mangroves will respond to increases in greenhouse gases and sea level, sustainable yields for silviculture, the difference in ecological functioning between tropical and temperate species, and why within the same species we get seaward and landward expansions. Obtaining this knowledge will help nations to better predict future mangrove behavior, and administer appropriate management policies.

== Summary ==
Mangrove loss has been a worldwide trend for the last 50 years due primarily to anthropogenic activities that compete for land area. Expansions in mangrove area do occur, but have a limited ability to offset the extensive losses. Recently the rate of loss has been declining due to a greater awareness of mangrove values, with legislation and conservation projects becoming more commonplace. It can only be hoped that this declining rate of loss continues, allowing future generations to appreciate the many benefits of mangroves.

== See also ==
- Mangrove – Mangrove Forest biome
- Mangrove ecoregions
- Ecological values of mangrove
- Coastal biogeomorphology
- Coastal erosion
- Mangroves in India
