= Ecological values of mangroves =

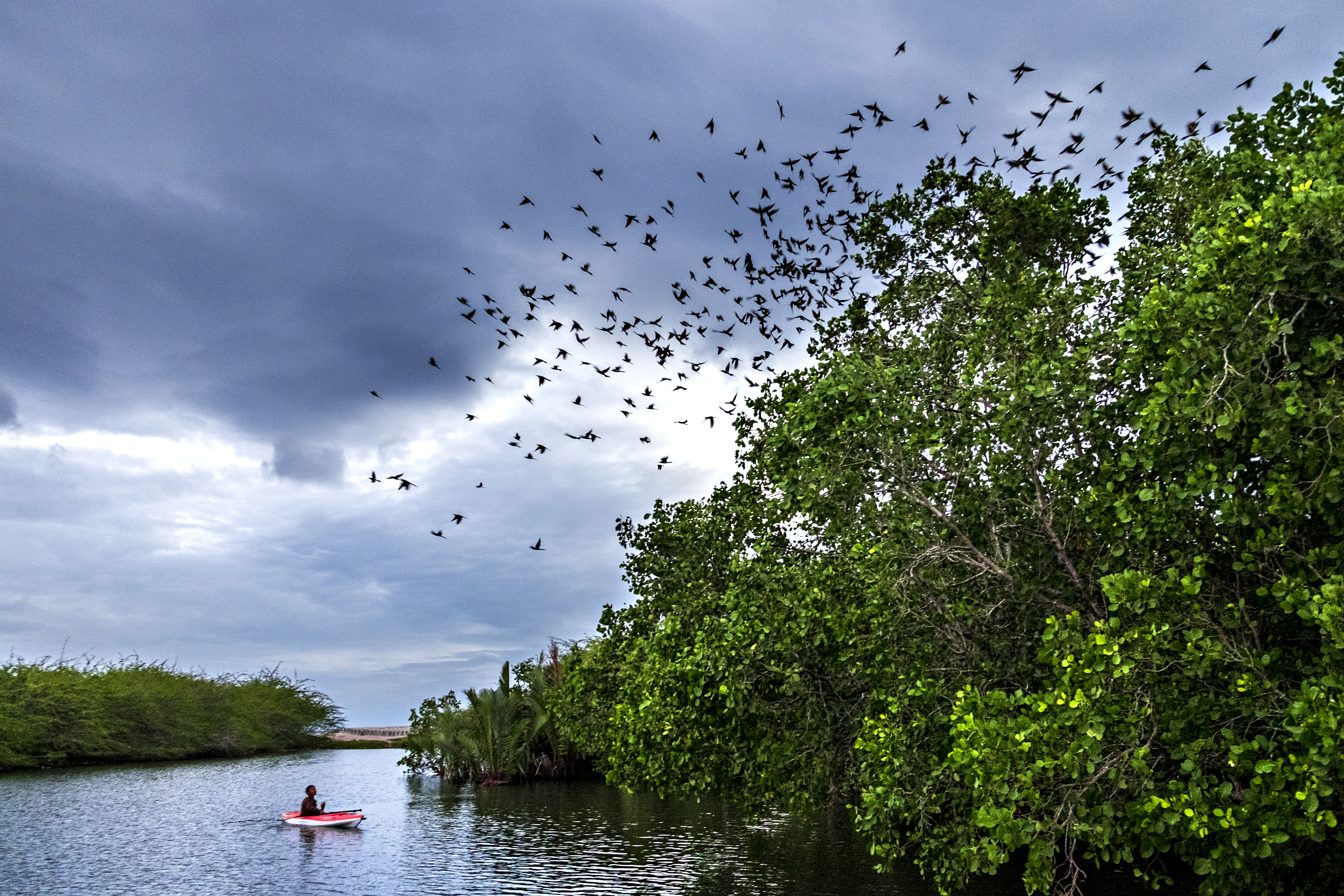
Mangroves in Lobo, Batangas established as an "Eco-Park" for local recreation and nature conservation.

Mangrove ecosystems represent natural capital capable of producing a wide range of goods and services for coastal environments and communities and society as a whole. Some of these outputs, such as timber, are freely exchanged in formal markets. Value is determined in these markets through exchange and quantified in terms of price. Mangrove forests are important for aquatic life and home for many species of fish.

Ecologically, mangroves provide habitats for many marine organisms, such as fish, shellfish, and prawn, as well as for many land-based organisms, such as birds and crocodiles. They also help to maintain water quality via nutrient cycling. Furthermore, they slow water, encouraging sediment to settle down, and also serve as breakwaters in storms or tsunamis, protecting the coasts.

Mangroves are also protected by several treaties or organizations, including both international treaties like the Ramsar Convention, and national marine protected areas in various countries.

== Ecological values ==
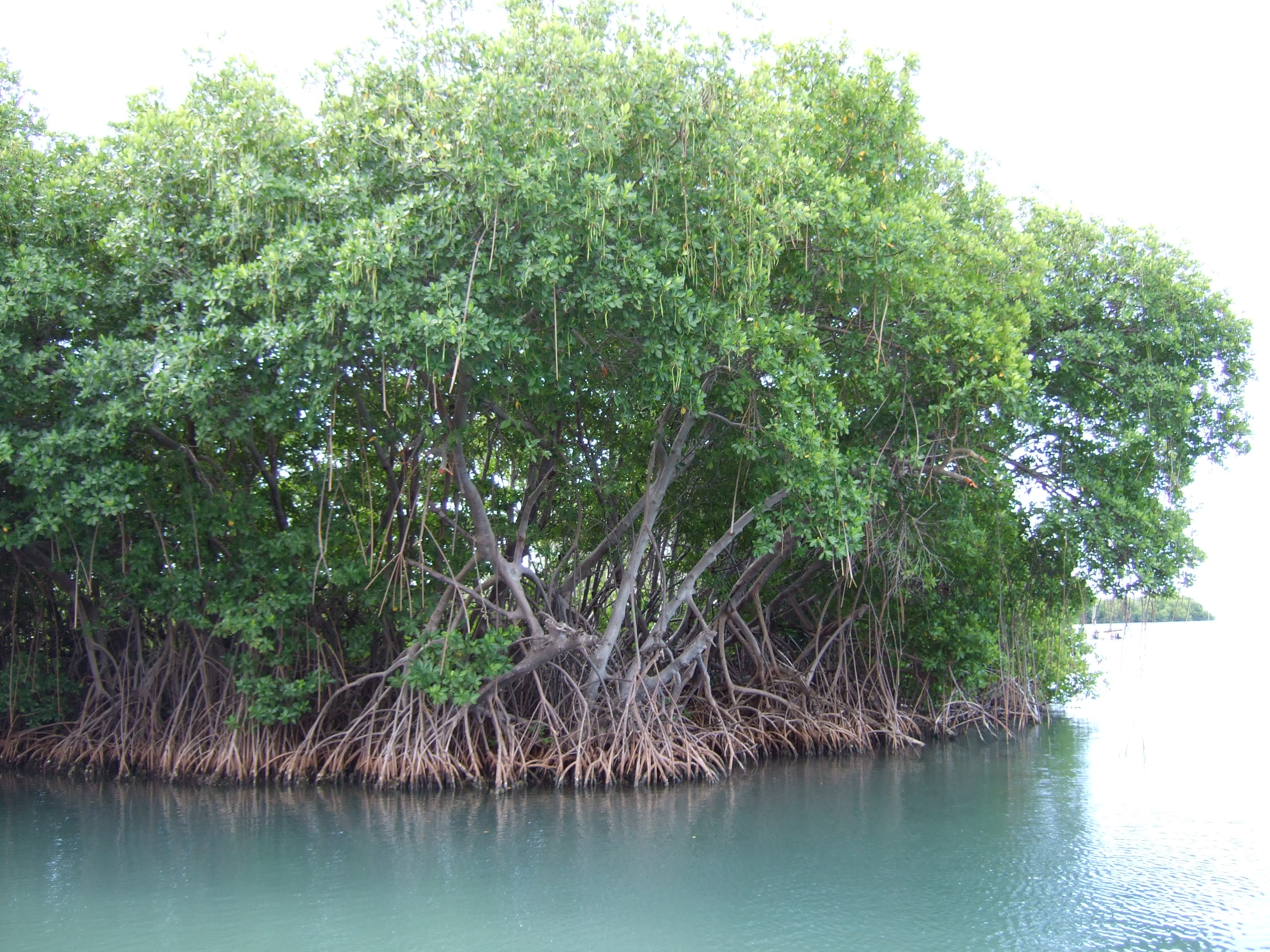
Mangroves in Puerto Rico

=== Marine fisheries ===
Mangroves provide nursery habitat for many wildlife species, including commercial fish and crustaceans, and thus contribute to sustaining the local abundance of fish and shellfish populations. In Selangor, Malaysia, 119 species were recorded as associated with mangrove ecosystems while 83 species were recorded in Kenya, 133 from Queensland, Australia, 59 species in Puerto Rico and 128 from the Philippines.

While mangroves in the Caribbean have been demonstrated to support juvenile coral reef fish, mangrove ecosystems in Papua New Guinea and the Solomon Islands have been found to provide important nurseries for sandy and muddy-bottom demersal and surface feeding species. Seventy-five percent of the game fish and ninety percent of the commercial species in South Florida are dependent on mangrove ecosystems. An estimated 75 percent of the commercially caught prawns and fish in Queensland, Australia, depend on mangroves for part of their life cycles and on nutrients exported from the mangroves to other ecosystems.

=== Wildlife habitat ===
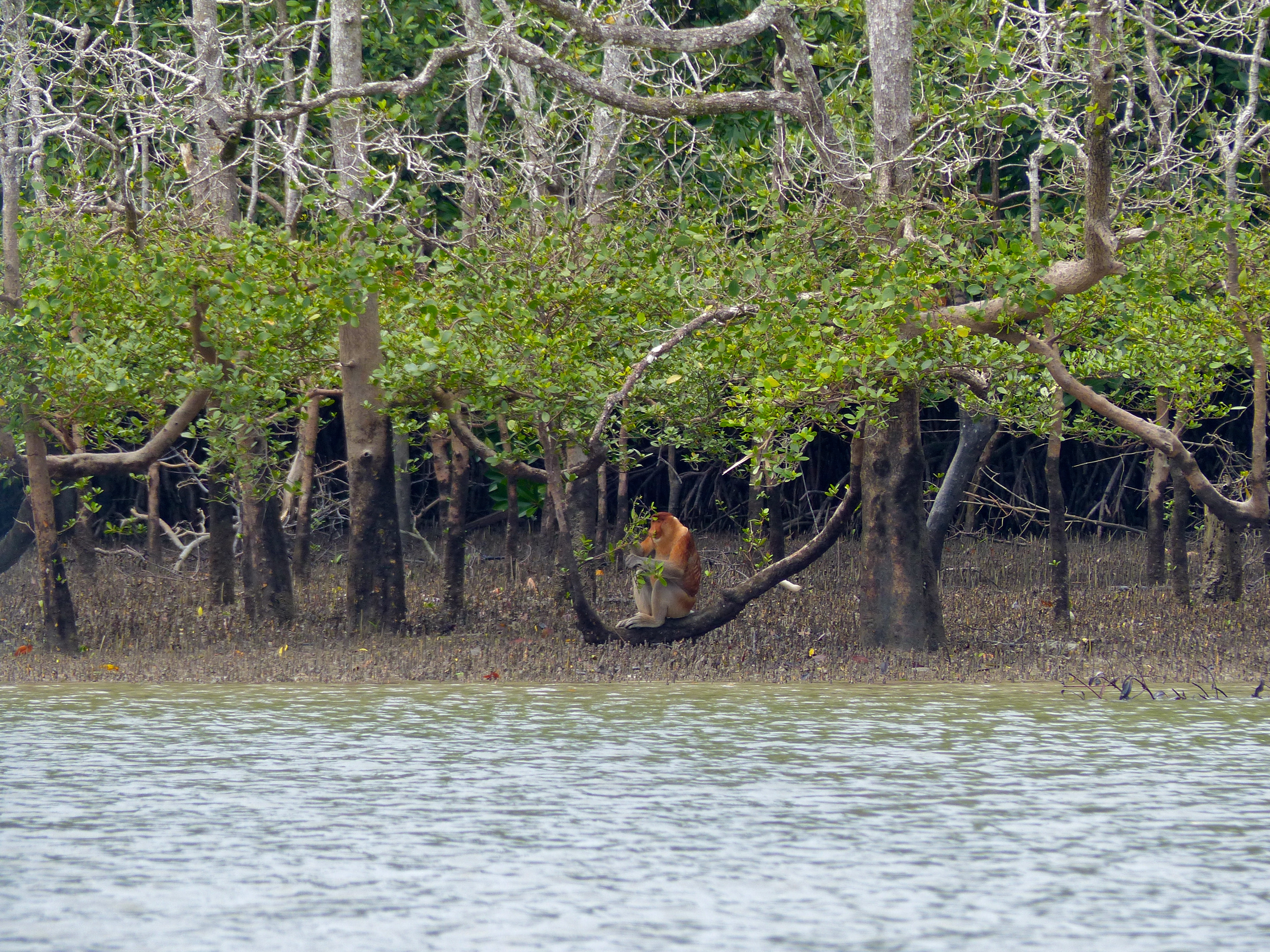
Proboscis monkey eating mangrove leaves in Sarawak.

Mangrove systems support a range of wildlife species including crocodiles, birds, tigers, deers, monkeys and honey bees. Many animals find shelter either in the roots or branches of mangroves. Mangroves serve as rookeries, or nesting areas, for coastal birds such as brown pelicans and roseate spoonbills. Many migratory species depend on mangroves for part of their seasonal migrations. For instance, an estimated two million migratory shorebirds of the East Asian-Australasian Flyway, which annually migrate from the Arctic Circle through South-East Asia to Australia and New Zealand and back, stop to forage at numerous wetlands along this Flyway, include the wetlands of Oceania.

=== Improving coastal water quality ===
Mangroves maintain coastal water quality by abiotic and biotic retention, removal, and cycling of nutrients, pollutants, and particulate matter from land-based sources, filtering these materials from water before they reach seaward coral reef and seagrass habitats. Mangrove root systems slow water flow, facilitating the deposition of sediment. Toxins and nutrients can be bound to sediment particles or within the molecular lattice of clay particles and are removed during sediment deposition. Compared with the expense of constructing a wastewater treatment plant, mangroves are commonly selected as receiving areas of effluent. Increasingly the notion of specifically constructed mangrove wetlands is being adopted and used for treatment of aquaculture and sewage effluents.

Mangroves are functionally linked to neighbouring coastal ecosystems. For instance, terrigenous sediments and nutrients carried by freshwater runoff are first filtered by coastal forests, then by mangrove wetlands, and finally by seagrass beds before reaching coral reefs. The existence and health of coral reefs are dependent on the buffering capacity of these shoreward ecosystems, which support the oligotrophic conditions needed by coral reefs to limit overgrowth by algae. Mangroves supply nutrients to adjacent coral reef and seagrass communities, sustaining these habitats' primary production and general health.

=== Climate change mitigation ===
Mangroves provide regulating ecosystem services and mitigate climate change. Mangrove forests absorb carbon from the atmosphere and store it in their biomass and in the waterlogged soils in which they grow, contributing to coastal blue carbon stocks.

=== Endangered mangrove coastlines and human development ===
As a result of their intricately entangled above-ground root systems, mangrove communities protect shorelines during storm events by absorbing wave energy and reducing the velocity of water passing through the root barrier. In addition, mangroves protect intertidal sediment along coastlines from eroding away in harsh weather year-round. As new cities are developed, mangrove forests around the world have felt a great impact not only on their ecosystems health, but also their wave-attenuating capacity. Wave energy may be reduced by 75 per cent in the wave's passage through 200 meters of mangrove forests, a very substantial amount once the mangrove has been removed. Mangrove covered shorelines are less likely to erode, or will erode significantly more slowly, than unvegetated shorelines during periods of high wave energy.

Other factors mangroves have an influence on, include coastal profile, water depth and bottom configuration. The mangrove population has felt both direct and indirect effects due to coastal engineering and human development, resulting in a devastating decline in population. This decline has led to a negative chain of effects in other ecosystems that are dependent on mangrove forest for survival. In just the last decade, at least 35 percent of the world's mangroves have been destroyed, exceeding the rate of the disappearance of tropical rainforests.

Mangroves provide a number of essentials for many different ecosystems, including food and shelter for a diverse animal community, living both below and above sea level. Maintaining a healthy mangrove forest sustains natural protection and is less expensive than seawalls and similar erosion control structures, which can increase erosion in front of the structure and at adjacent properties due to coastal currents. Unless ecosystems have the space to adjust their location or elevation in the intertidal zone to the sea level rise, they will be stressed by changed inundation periods. The Global Mean Sea Level (GMSL) has risen 4 to 8 inches over the past century, almost twice the average rate of 80 years prior. It appears that as the sea-level is slowly rising, mangroves are a better alternative to protecting coastlines from eroding than other man made structures, such as seawalls.

The 2004 Indian Ocean earthquake and tsunami illustrated that healthy mangroves serve as a natural barrier against massive waves – protecting infrastructure developments and saving lives. The World Conservation Union (IUCN) compared the death toll from two villages in Sri Lanka that were hit by the devastating tsunami giant waves. Two people died in the settlement with dense mangrove and scrub forest, while up to 6,000 people died in the village without similar vegetation This study proves that mangroves provide a natural wall, which is necessary in high impact natural disasters areas such as this one.

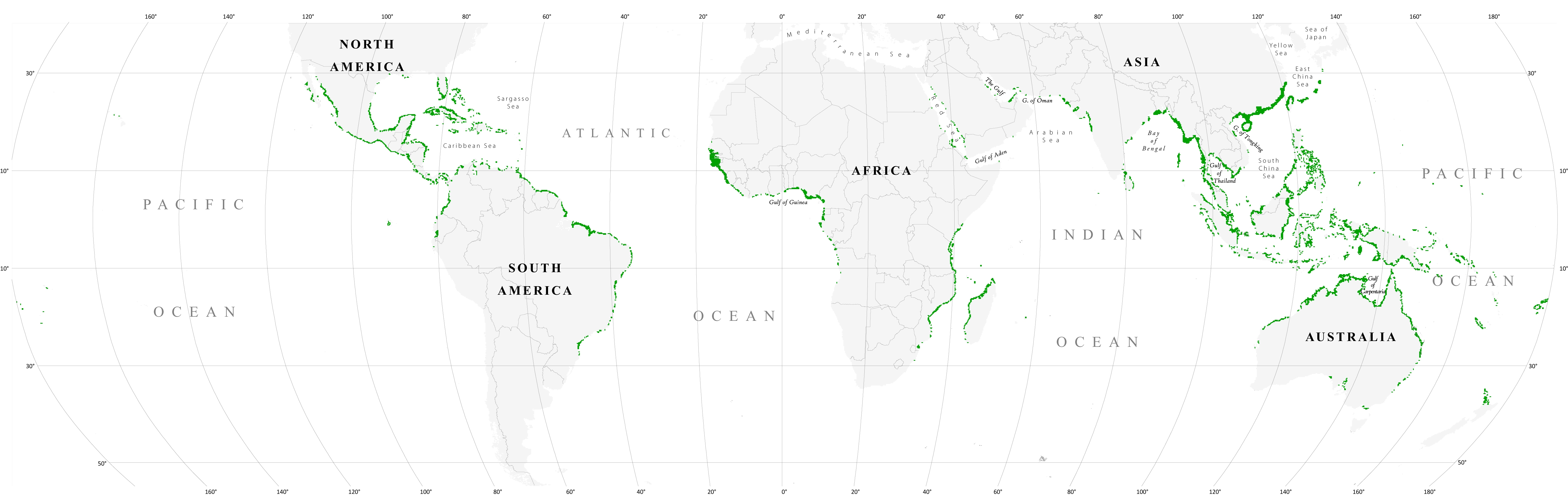
Mangrove forests of the world in 2000

== The role of mangroves in New Zealand ==
Comparisons of the productivity of mangroves from different latitudes worldwide suggest that productivity and plant biomass decreases with increasing latitude. From this global pattern it is expected that mangroves in New Zealand, near their southern geographical limit would have relatively low productivity compared to their tropical equivalents.

=== Intrinsic and unique values ===
Many aspects of New Zealand mangrove systems have not yet been sufficiently studied; therefore their importance in relation to marine and estuarine species and their role in terms of ecosystem structure and function is inadequately understood. The role played by mangroves in New Zealand estuarine foodwebs is, however, probably significant.

=== Benthic fauna of mangroves ===
Relatively few studies have been undertaken on the benthic assemblages and species of mangrove forests in New Zealand. The benthic invertebrate fauna of New Zealand's mangroves forests appear to be modest in both abundances and species diversity compared to other estuarine habitats.

=== Fish fauna of mangrove ecosystems ===
Recent studies have shown that the temperate mangrove forests of northern New Zealand support high abundances of small fishes, but that New Zealand support high abundances of small fishes compared to other estuarine habitats, with most of the small fish assemblage dominated by juveniles of the ubiquitous yellow-eyed mullet (Aldrichetta forsteri), as well as juvenile grey mullet (Mugil cephalus) in the west coast estuaries. Nineteen fish species are 'confirmed' to be associated with mangroves, of which three species are probably partially reliant on them as juvenile nurseries. It seems unlikely that New Zealand mangroves are important as spawning grounds for coastal fish or as habitat for their larvae.

=== Use of mangroves by birds ===
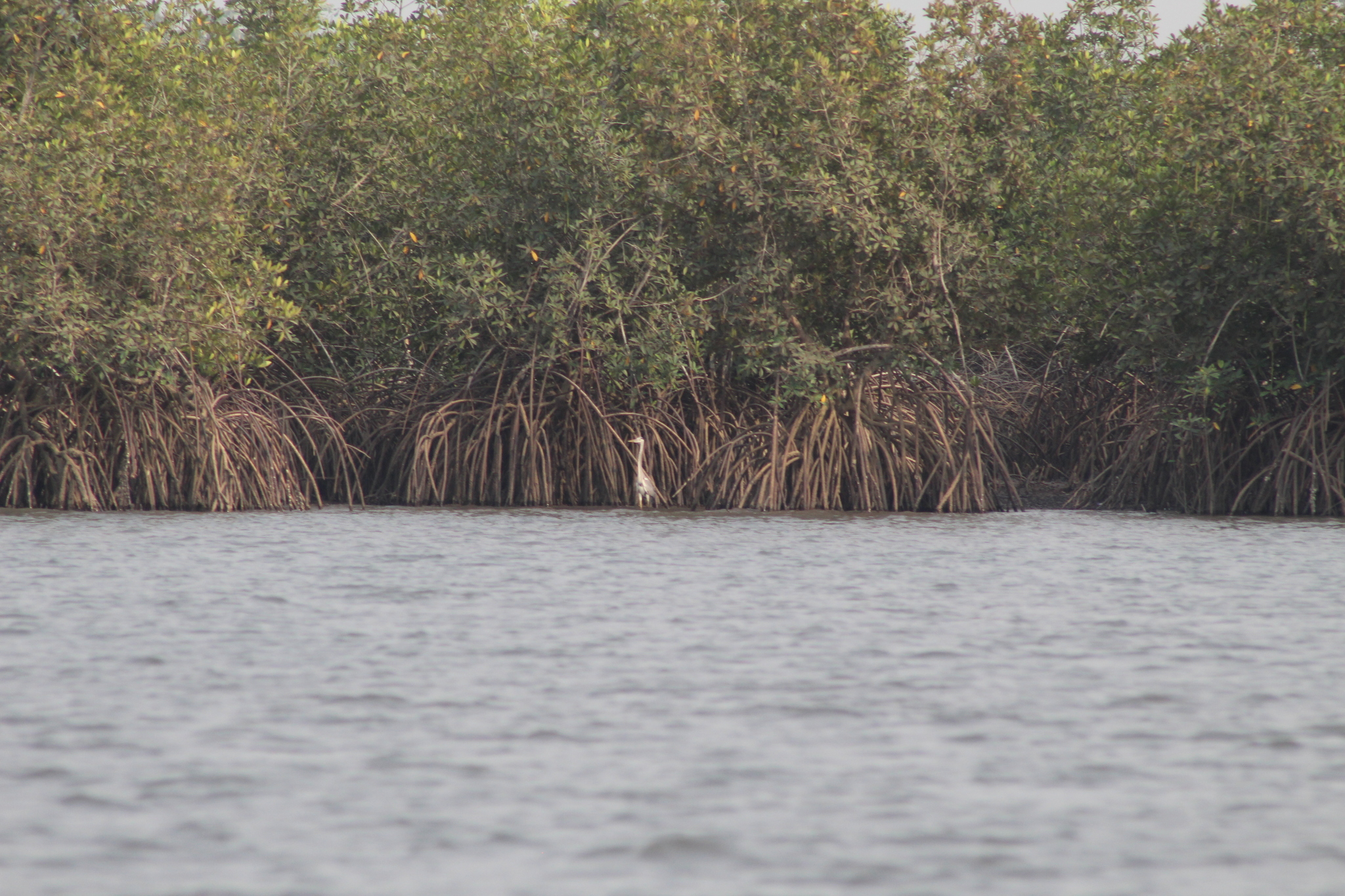
A gray heron in a mangrove swamp in Sierra Leone

While many species make extensive use of mangroves for roosting, feeding and breeding, no bird species is totally dependent on mangroves in New Zealand. The range of bird species that are found regularly in New Zealand mangroves includes several native species, such as banded rail, white-faced heron, harriers, kingfishers, welcome swallow and pükeko.

=== Role of mangroves in sediment trapping and erosion prevention ===
This question has not been fully addressed in relation to New Zealand mangroves. However, previous and ongoing research, is extending the understanding of the role of mangrove contribution to habitat change. Remains of rows of mangroves planted to stabilize the coast by early generations of Maoris can still be seen in New Zealand.

== Mangrove management ==
The next section briefly discusses how mangroves have been managed today at the international and national level. Mangrove biodiversity, management, and conservation have received considerable attention in recent years since research has increased the understanding of the values, functions and attributes of mangrove ecosystems. Mangrove restoration practices have also greatly improved over the past several years.

=== International level ===
At the international level, the common approach to major environmental policy issues has been to formulate conventions, treaties and agreements, which all concerned countries become signatories to. Mangroves are today a global issue because more than 100 countries worldwide have mangrove resources. Of the approximately 100 countries that have mangrove vegetation, around 20 have undertaken rehabilitation initiatives, establishing nurseries and attempting afforestation and re-planting in degraded areas. More than half a dozen international agreements and various regional agreements are directly relevant to the conservation of mangrove biodiversity.

=== Ramsar Convention ===
In 1971, a convention to protect "Wetlands of International Importance" was adopted in the Iranian city of Ramsar. To become a signatory to the Ramsar Convention, a country had to designate at least one such site and guarantee its protection. Around 110 countries have become signatories to the treaty. Some 850 "Ramsar sites" have been designated by these countries covering over 53 million hectares. About a third of these contain mangroves (e.g. Mangrove Action Project).

=== Marine Protected Areas ===
Spalding reviewed the global status for mangrove conservation: "There are 685 protected areas containing mangroves globally, distributed between 73 countries and territories. Countries with very large areas of mangroves have a significant number of protected areas notably Australia (180), Indonesia (64) and Brazil (63). Examples of marine reserves in New Zealand where mangrove form an important component of the protected foreshore vegetation are Motu Manawa (Pollen Island) Marine Reserve in the Waitematā Harbour, and Te Matuku Bay Marine Reserve, Waiheke Island; both managed by the Department of Conservation.

=== National level ===
Historically the responsibility of mangrove management at the national level in many tropical mangrove countries have been assigned on a sectoral basis to executing agencies of the government, institutions for example Forestry, Fishery or Agriculture Departments. The agencies responsible for administering mangroves differ between each country and even between states and districts within Countries.

Sectoral management has inevitably resulted in prejudices regarding their objectives, leading to conflicts of interest, to unsustainable resource use, and to poor and less powerful groups becoming more disadvantaged and disenfranchised. These limitations are now recognised as a major constraint to achieving sustainable development of mangrove resources.

=== Limitations of management ===
Lack of knowledge of mangrove ecosystems, their extent, status and linkages to other ecosystems hampers efforts to conserve and manage mangroves, leading to the unsustainable exploitation of this productive coastal resources. According to a comprehensive information database of mangrove biodiversity in each country is necessary to monitor the status of mangrove biological diversity, realise its economic potential and areas of application. This is critical in planning an effective management of mangroves.

Economic arguments carry the greatest weight in conservation and management of mangroves. However, the true economic value of mangrove diversity and natural resources is difficult to measure and important ecological processes and functions undervalued. All development plans and policies should include economic valuations that fully reflect the sociological, ecological and environmental costs of resource use, physical developments and pollution.

In New Zealand for example much of the basic information required to address concerns and manage mangrove is lacking. Research has established that, regardless of which approach is decided upon, sustainable management can only be achieved if evaluation of mangrove areas is undertaken on a site-by-site basis.

== See also ==
- Ecological Economics
- Mangrove
- Mangrove Restoration
- Changes in global mangrove distributions
- Salt marsh
- Coastal biogeomorphology
- Coastal erosion
- Coastal management
- Earth economics (policy think tank)
- Ramsar Convention
- Coral reefs
