= Jubail Island =

Coordinates: 24°31′27″N 54°29′26″E

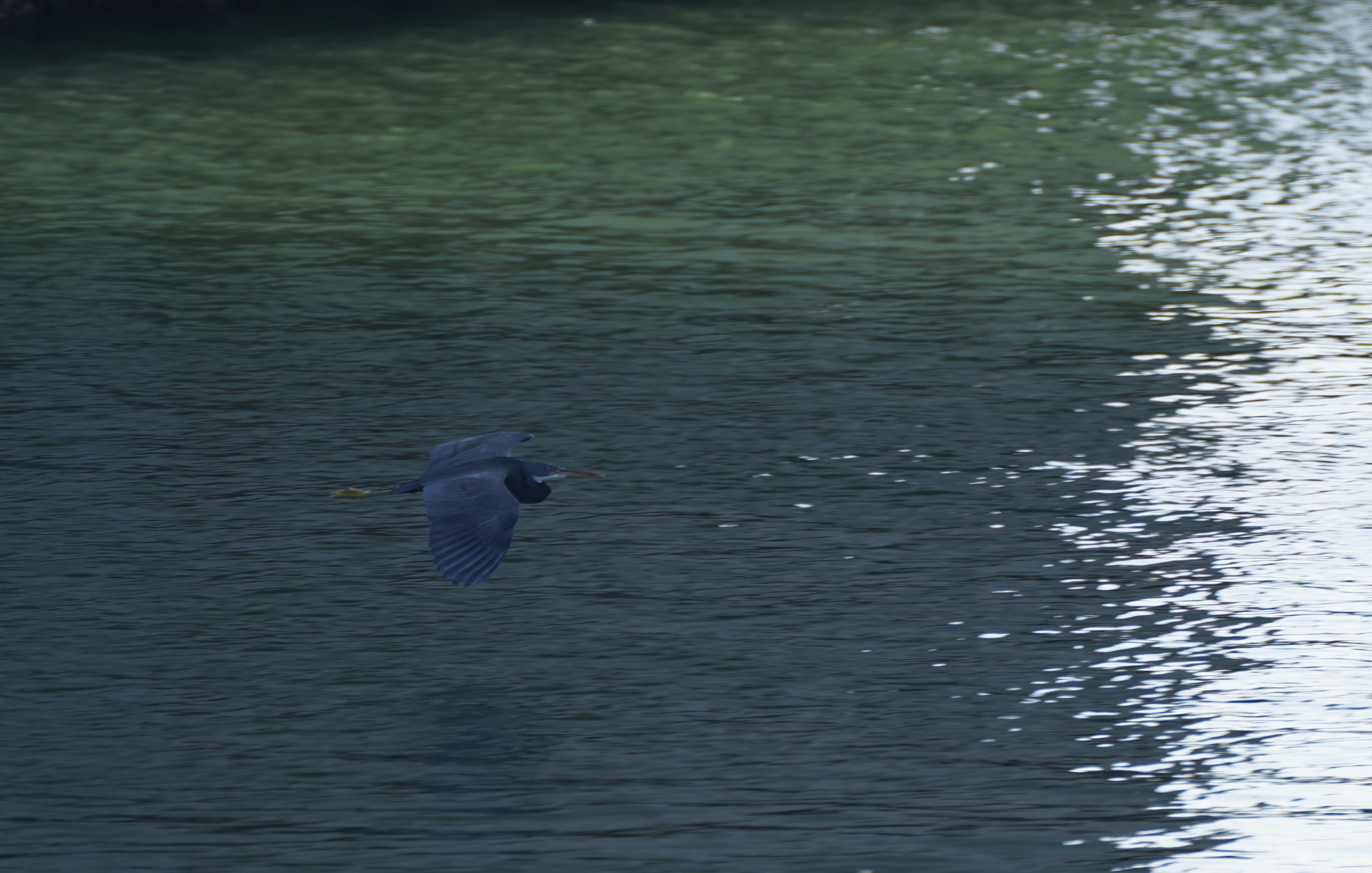
A Western Reef Heron, in flight across a waterbody in the Jubail Mangroves Abu Dhabi, United Arab Emirates.

Jubail Island, also known as Al Jubail Island, is a waterfront master-planned residential development located in the Abu Dhabi Central Capital District. Situated between Yas Island and Saadiyat Island, the project spans approximately 4,000 to 5,000 hectares (9,900 to 12,400 acres) of natural mangrove forests and coastal estuaries. Developed by the Jubail Island Investment Company (JIIC), a subsidiary of LEAD Development, Jubail Island was officially announced in 2019 as part of the Abu Dhabi government's Abu Dhabi Vision 2030 initiative.

== Overview ==
Jubail Island is located between Yas Island and Saadiyat Island. Jubail Mangrove Park, a mangrove tree sanctuary and wildlife sanctuary, is located on Jubail Island. Jubail Island has six residential villages, Marfaa Al Jubail, Nad Al Dhabi, Seef Al Jubail, Ain Al Maha, Souk Al Jubail and Bada Al Jubail. It accommodates 10,000 people. The project also houses Souk Al Jubail, or The Souk, a hub that connects the six villages on the island, as well as a commercial and retail area that includes shopping areas, medical facilities, a mosque, and health and wellness centres.

== Development programme ==
As part of the Abu Dhabi government’s Abu Dhabi Vision 2030 initiative, LEAD Development formed the Jubail Island Investment Company (JIIC) to develop the Jubail Island project. The Jubail Island project was officially announced in 2019. In June 2021, the Jubail Island Investment Company started work on the first villas in Jubail Island. In the same year, Abdulla Saeed Al-Shamsi was appointed as operations director of JIIC. In 2022, Ain Al Maha, a waterfront village within the project, was also announced.

Souk Al Jubail, or The Souk, Jubail Island’s commercial and retail hub, launched in 2023. Jubail Terraces, a new community in Jubail Island’s Souk Al Jubail, started development in April 2023. In July of the same year, the Jubail Island development’s water network, main infrastructure works, and electrical substations became operational. The country of Abu Dhabi also established the Jubail Mangrove Innovation Centre on Jubail Island as part of an agreement with the Environment Agency in October 2023.

In February 2025, Jubail Island and Lead Development won a safety award from the Abu Dhabi city municipality. In May 2025, Modern Gas completed an integrated natural gas project on Jubail Island.
