= Coastal biogeomorphology =

Subdiscipline of geomorphology

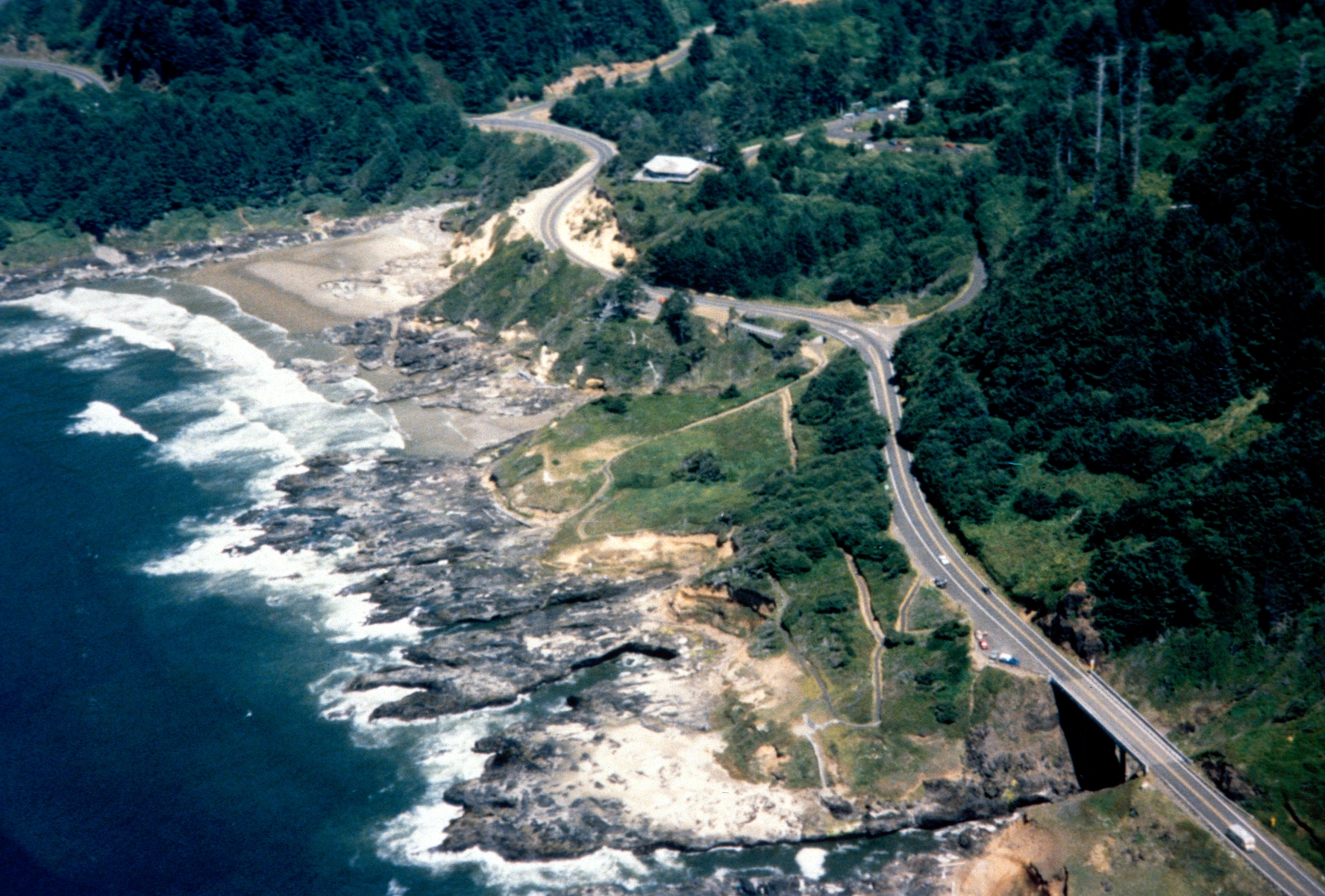
The shape of coastlines can be influenced by biological processes

Since the 1990s, biogeomorphology has developed as an established research field examining the interrelationship between organisms and geomorphic processes in a variety of environments, both marine, and terrestrial. Coastal biogeomorphology looks at the interaction between marine organisms and coastal geomorphic processes. Biogeomorphology is a subdiscipline of geomorphology.

This can include not only microorganisms and plants, but animals as well. These interactions are important factors in the development of certain environments like salt marsh, mangrove and other types of coastal wetlands as well as influencing coastal and shoreline stability.

== Main processes ==
There are three main processes related to biogeomorphology: bioerosion, bioprotection, and bioconstruction. Bioerosion is the erosion of ocean substrates by living organisms. Bioprotection refers to the protection of substrate from various forms erosion by the presence of organisms, and the structures they create (i.e. coral reefs). Finally bioconstruction refers to the physical construction of biological structures on ocean substrate. Marine biota interact with landform processes by building structures, accumulating carbonate sediments, accelerating erosion by boring or bioturbation, and marine plant life contribute to shoreline stability, especially in marsh and wetland environments. Experimental wave mesocosms are one approach used to study these interactions under controlled hydrodynamic conditions.

== Role in shoreline stability ==
The interaction between marine biota and geologic processes is important to shoreline stability, especially in soft sedimentary environments where sediments are more likely to erode away. Benthic and planktonic organisms, as well as shellfish filter, package, and even bind fine sediments together in tidal regions. This action reduces turbidity in the area by solidifying and protecting loose, soft sediments, and thus allowing more colonization by other organisms. If disturbance of these soft sediments occurs, particularly through human interaction such as shellfish harvesting, dredging, or the introduction of toxins, the environment may drastically change. If this occurs, and marine biota are removed from the environment, erosion can occur, or increase, especially in regions prone to wave action and tidal re-suspension. In seagrass systems, experimental studies have examined how below-ground structures and wave exposure influence sediment stability and erosion.

== See also ==
- Changes in global mangrove distributions
