= Mangrove forest =

Productive wetlands that occur in coastal intertidal zones

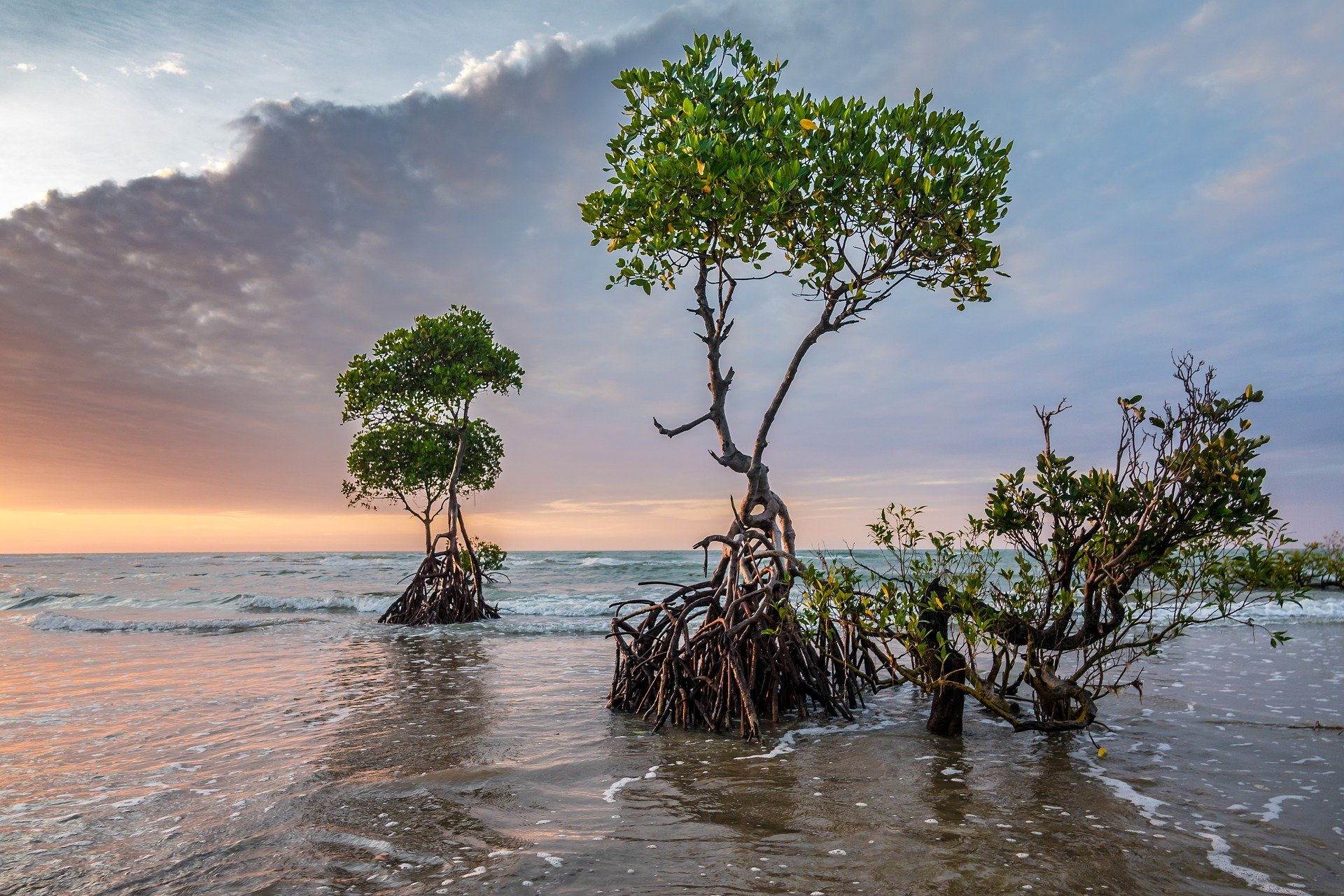
Mangroves in an ebb tide

Mangrove forests, also called mangrove swamps, mangrove thickets or mangals, are productive wetlands located in tropical and subtropical intertidal zones. Approximately 80 mangrove species exist, all adapted to areas where slow-moving water allows for the deposition of fine sediment and low-oxygen soil conditions. These trees cannot endure freezing temperatures, which restricts their distribution to warmer climates.

Their distinct, stilt-like roots allow the trees to slow the movement of tidal waters, causing the settlement of suspended sediments and acting as a protective barrier to reduce coastal erosion. These roots also provide an important habitat for many species.

Mangrove forests live at the interface between the land, the ocean, and the atmosphere, and are centres for the flow of energy and matter between these systems. They have attracted much research interest because of the various ecological functions of the mangrove ecosystems, including runoff and flood prevention, storage and recycling of nutrients and wastes, cultivation and energy conversion. The forests are major blue carbon systems, storing considerable amounts of carbon in marine sediments, thus becoming important regulators of climate change. Marine microorganisms are key parts of these mangrove ecosystems. However, much remains to be discovered about how mangrove microbiomes contribute to high ecosystem productivity and efficient cycling of elements.

In 2025, the area of mangroves globally was estimated at 15.9 million hectares. Asia has the largest area, at 6.10 million ha, and Europe reported no mangrove area. Among countries and areas, Indonesia has the world's largest extent of mangroves, at 3.40 million ha, followed by Brazil (1.39 million ha), Australia (1.11 million ha), Nigeria (976 000 ha) and Mexico (947 000 ha). Collectively, these five countries host almost half (49%) of the global mangrove area.

== Overview ==
External videos
- Mangrove Photography Awards 2020 – Mangrove Action Project

Mangrove forests, are productive wetlands located in tropical and subtropical intertidal zones. Approximately 80 mangrove species exist, all adapted to areas where slow-moving water allows for the deposition of fine sediment and low-oxygen soil conditions. These trees cannot endure freezing temperatures, which restricts their distribution to warmer climates.

Their distinct, stilt-like roots allow the trees to slow the movement of tidal waters, causing the settlement of suspended sediments and acting as a protective barrier to reduce coastal erosion from storm surge and waves. These roots also provide a habitat for many species and act as nurseries for juvenile fish, including species that are recreationally and commercially important.

The main contribution of mangroves to the larger ecosystem comes from litter fall from the trees, which is then decomposed by primary consumers. Bacteria and protozoans colonise the plant litter and break it down chemically into organic compounds, minerals, carbon dioxide, and nitrogenous wastes. The intertidal existence to which these trees are adapted represents the major limitation to the number of species able to thrive in their habitat. High tide brings in salt water, and when the tide recedes, solar evaporation of the seawater in the soil leads to further increases in salinity. The return of tide can flush out these soils, bringing them back to salinity levels comparable to that of seawater. At low tide, organisms are exposed to increases in temperature and reduced moisture before being then cooled and flooded by the tide. Thus, for a plant to survive in this environment, it must tolerate broad ranges of salinity, temperature, and moisture, as well as several other key environmental factors—thus only a select few species make up the mangrove tree community.

A mangrove swamp typically features only a small number of tree species. It is not uncommon for a mangrove forest in the Caribbean to feature only three or four tree species. For comparison, a tropical rainforest biome may contain thousands of tree species, but this is not to say mangrove forests lack diversity. Though the trees are few in species, the ecosystem that these trees create provides a habitat for a great variety of other species, including as many as 174 species of marine megafauna.

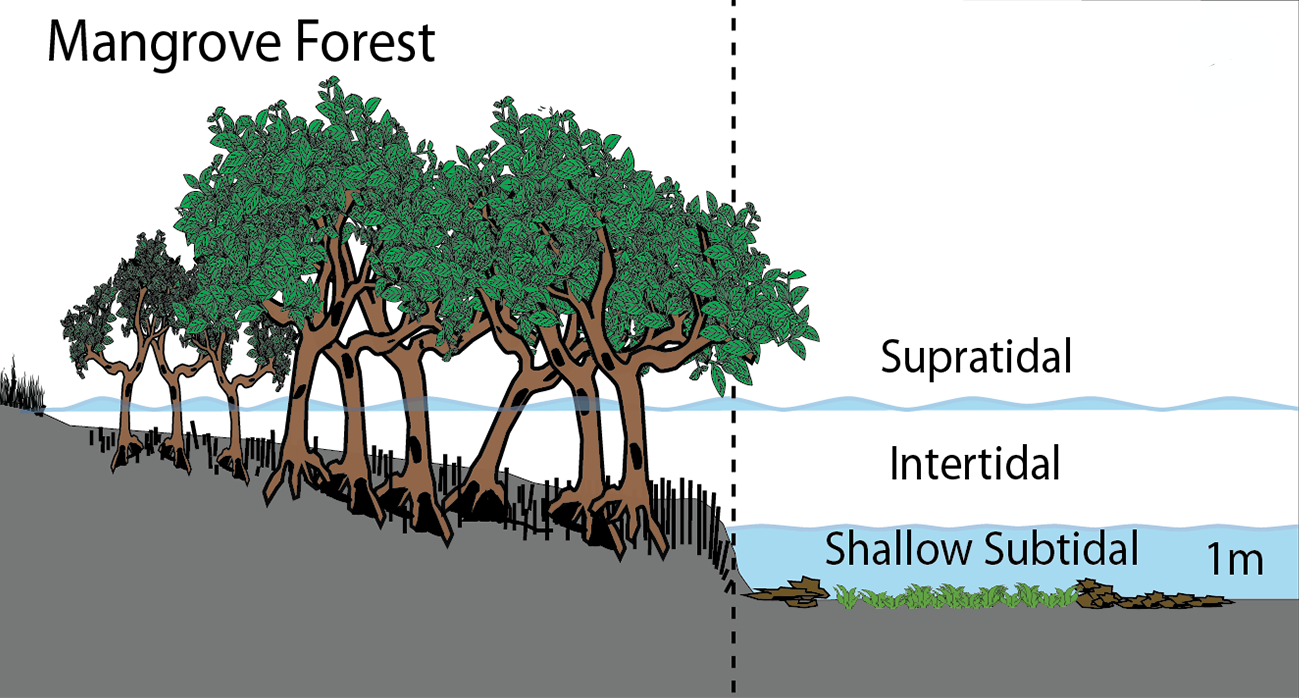
Mangrove ecosystem in the coastal intertidal zone Seagrass and oyster beds can inhabit the shallow subtidal zone

Mangrove plants require a number of physiological adaptations to overcome the problems of low environmental oxygen levels, high salinity, and frequent tidal flooding. Each species has its own solutions to these problems; this may be the primary reason why, on some shorelines, mangrove tree species show distinct zonation. Small environmental variations within a mangal may lead to greatly differing methods for coping with the environment. Therefore, the mix of species is partly determined by the tolerances of individual species to physical conditions, such as tidal flooding and salinity, but may also be influenced by other factors, such as crabs preying on plant seedlings.

Once established, mangrove roots provide an oyster habitat and slow water flow, thereby enhancing sediment deposition in areas where it is already occurring. The fine, anoxic sediments under mangroves act as sinks for a variety of heavy (trace) metals which colloidal particles in the sediments have concentrated from the water. Mangrove removal disturbs these underlying sediments, often creating problems of trace metal contamination of seawater and organisms of the area.

Mangrove swamps protect coastal areas from erosion, storm surge (especially during tropical cyclones), and tsunamis. They limit high-energy wave erosion mainly during events such as storm surges and tsunamis. The mangroves' massive root systems are efficient at dissipating wave energy. Likewise, they slow down tidal water enough so that its sediment is deposited as the tide comes in, leaving all except fine particles when the tide ebbs. In this way, mangroves build their environments. Because of the uniqueness of mangrove ecosystems and the protection against erosion they provide, they are often the object of conservation programs, including national biodiversity action plans.

== Distribution ==
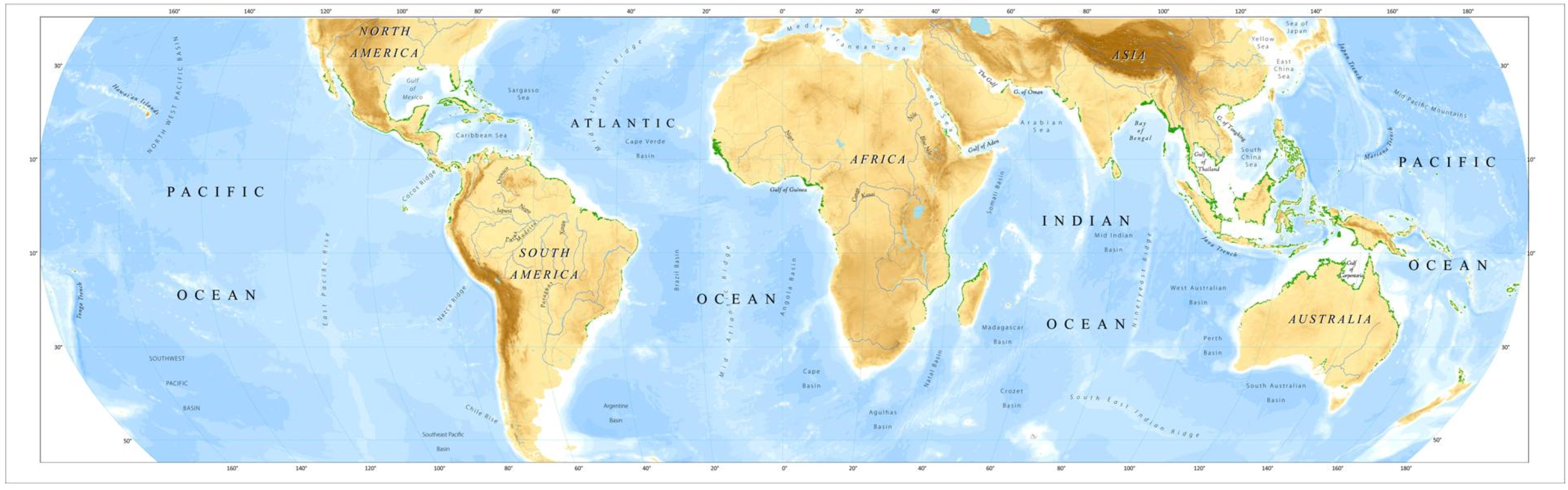
Global distribution of mangrove forests, 2011 Mangrove forest (click to enlarge)

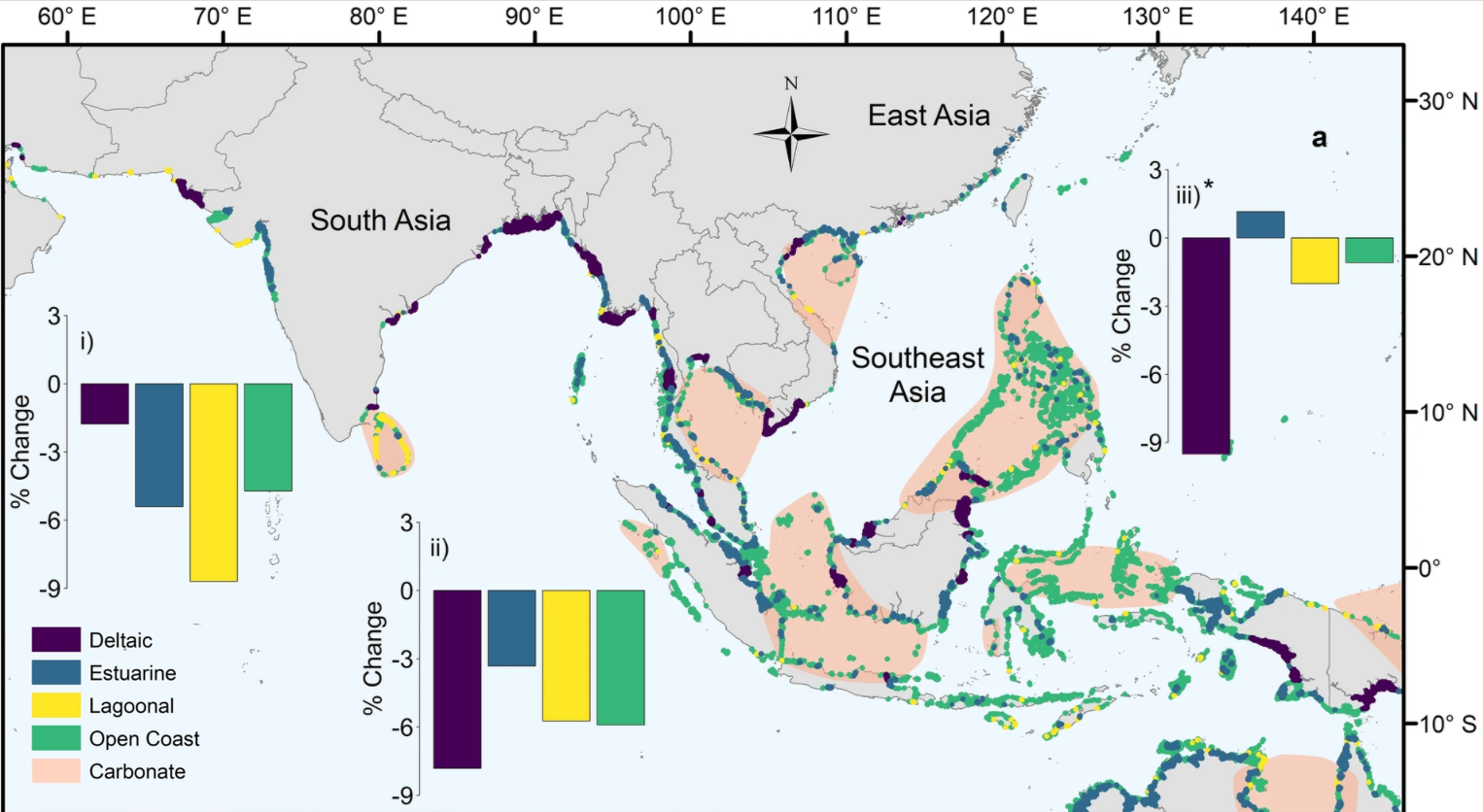
Diversity of mangroves is greatest in Southeast Asia Distribution of delta, estuary, lagoon and open coast mangrove types in (i) South Asia, (ii) Southeast Asia and (iii) East Asia Bar charts show percentage change in area between 1996 and 2016

Worldwide there are about 80 described species of mangroves that live along marine coasts. About 60 of these species are true mangroves which live only in the intertidal zone between high and low tides. "Mangroves once covered three-quarters of the world's tropical coastlines, with Southeast Asia hosting the greatest diversity. Only 12 species live in the Americas. Mangroves range in size from small bushes to the 60-meter giants found in Ecuador. Within a given mangrove forest, different species occupy distinct niches. Those that can handle tidal soakings grow in the open sea, in sheltered bays, and on fringe islands. Trees adapted to drier, less salty soil can be found farther from the shoreline. Some mangroves flourish along riverbanks far inland, as long as the freshwater current is met by ocean tides."

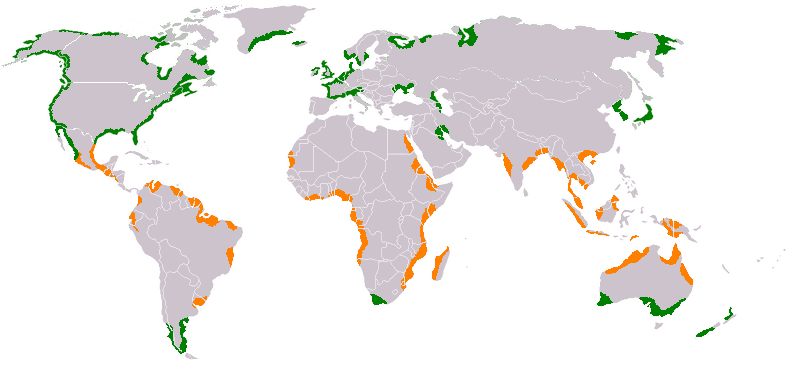
Mangroves dominate in tropical regions and salt marshes in temperate regions mangroves dominate salt marshes dominate

Mangroves can be found in 118 countries and territories in the tropical and subtropical regions of the world. The largest percentage of mangroves is found between the 5° N and 5° S latitudes. Approximately 75% of world's mangroves are found in just 15 countries. Estimates of mangrove area based on remote sensing and global data tend to be lower than estimates based on literature and surveys for comparable periods.

In 2018, the Global Mangrove Watch Initiative released a global baseline based on remote sensing and global data for 2010. They estimated the total mangrove forest area of the world as of 2010 at 137,600 km^{2} (53,100 mi^{2}), spanning 118 countries and territories. Following the conventions for identifying geographic regions from the Ramsar Convention on Wetlands, researchers reported that Asia has the largest share (38.7%) of the world's mangroves, followed by Latin America and the Caribbean (20.3%), Africa (20.0%), Oceania (11.9%), and Northern America (8.4%).

=== Sundarbans ===
The largest mangrove forest in the world is in the Sundarbans. The Sundarban forest lies in the vast delta on the Bay of Bengal formed by the super confluence of the Brahmaputra and Meghna rivers with distributaries of the Ganges. The seasonally flooded Sundarbans freshwater swamp forests lie inland from the mangrove forests on the coastal fringe. The forest covers 10,000 km^{2} (3,900 mi^{2}) of which about 6,000 km^{2} (2,300 mi^{2}) are in Bangladesh.

The Sundarbans is intersected by a complex network of tidal waterways, mudflats and small islands of salt-tolerant mangrove forests. The interconnected network of waterways makes almost every portion of the forest accessible by boat. The area is known as an important habitat for the endangered Bengal tiger, as well as numerous fauna including species of birds, spotted deer, crocodiles and snakes. The fertile soils of the delta have been subject to intensive human use for centuries, and the ecoregion has been mostly converted to intensive agriculture, with few enclaves of forest remaining. Additionally, the Sundarbans serves a crucial function as a protective barrier for millions of inhabitants against floods that result from cyclones.

Four protected areas in the Sundarbans are listed as UNESCO World Heritage Sites. Despite these protections, the Indian Sundarbans were assessed as endangered in 2020 under the IUCN Red List of Ecosystems framework. There is a consistent pattern of depleted biodiversity or loss of species and the ecological quality of the forest is declining.

Map of the Sundarbans

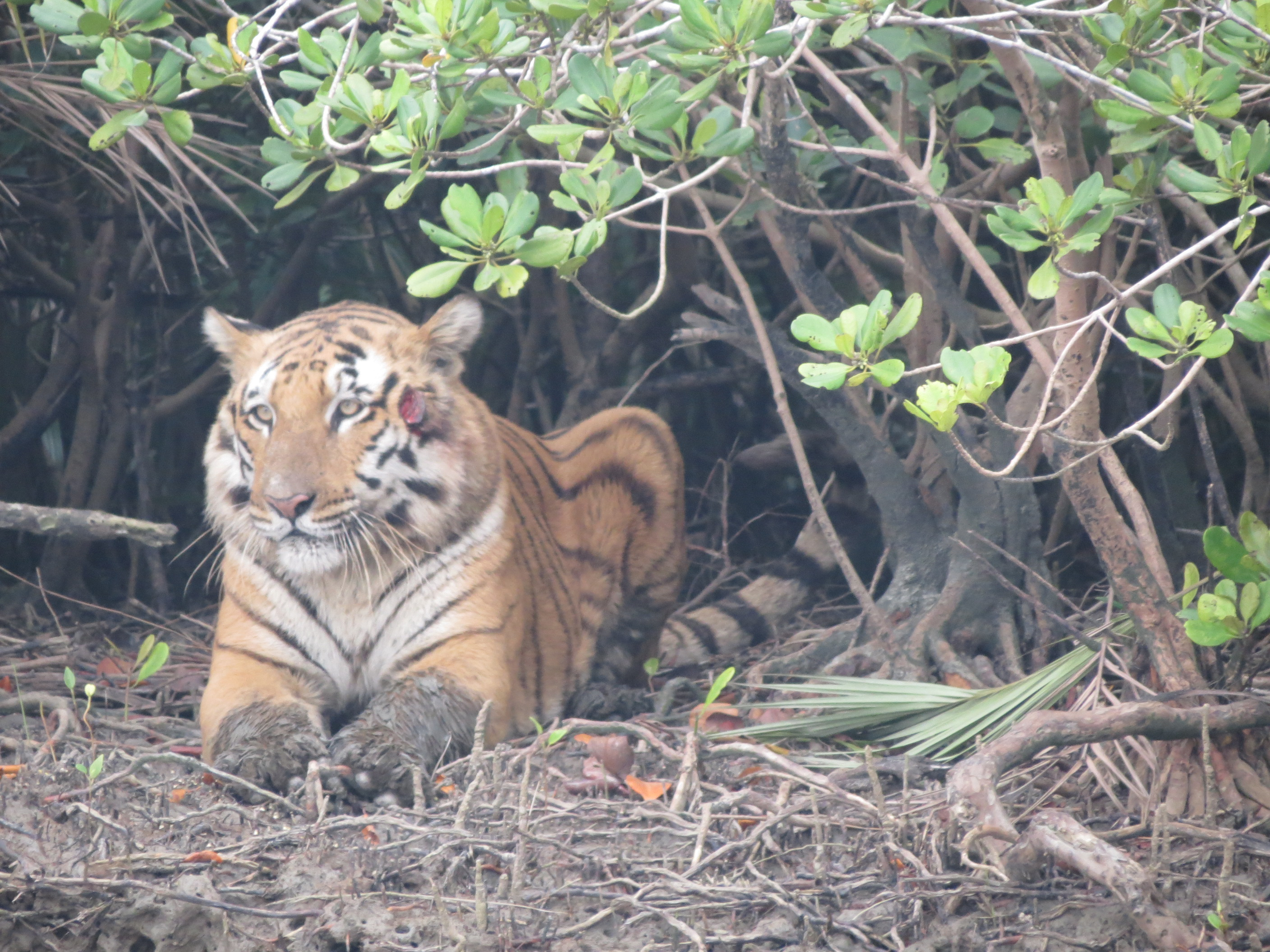
Bengal tiger in the Sundarbans

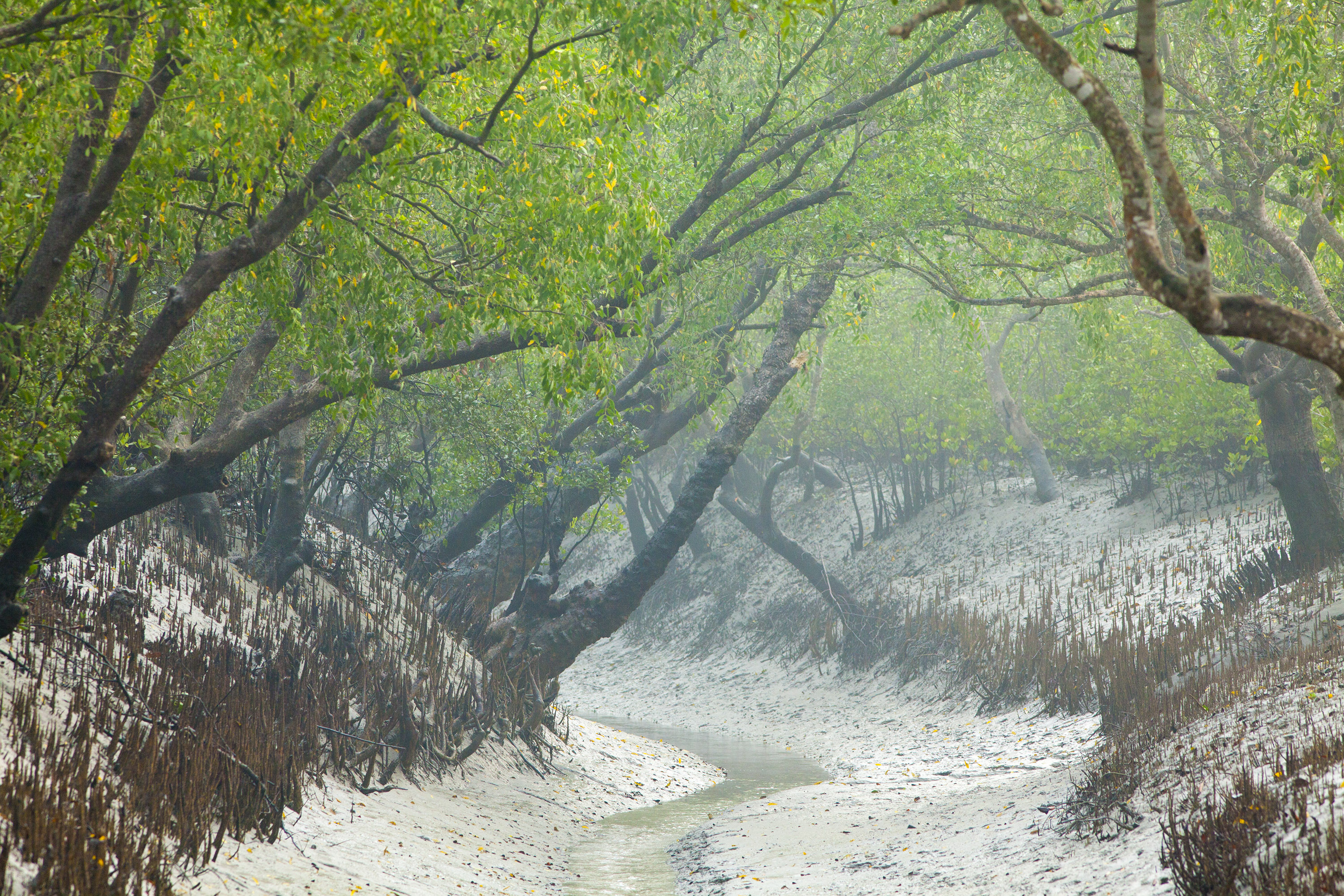
Channel in low tide

== Ecosystem ==
The unique ecosystem found in the intricate mesh of mangrove roots offers a quiet marine habitat for young organisms. In areas where roots are permanently submerged, the organisms they host include algae, barnacles, oysters, sponges, and bryozoa, which all require a hard surface for anchoring while they filter-feed. Shrimp and mud lobsters use the muddy bottoms as their home. Mangrove crabs eat the mangrove leaves, adding nutrients to the mangal mud for other bottom feeders. In at least some cases, the export of carbon fixed in mangroves is important in coastal food webs. Mangrove plantations host several commercially important species of fish and crustaceans.

In Puerto Rico, the red, white, and black mangroves occupy different ecological niches and have slightly different chemical compositions, so the carbon content varies between the species, as well between the different tissues of the plant (e.g., leaf matter versus roots). There is a clear succession of these three trees from the lower elevations, which are dominated by red mangroves, to farther inland with a higher concentration of white mangroves.

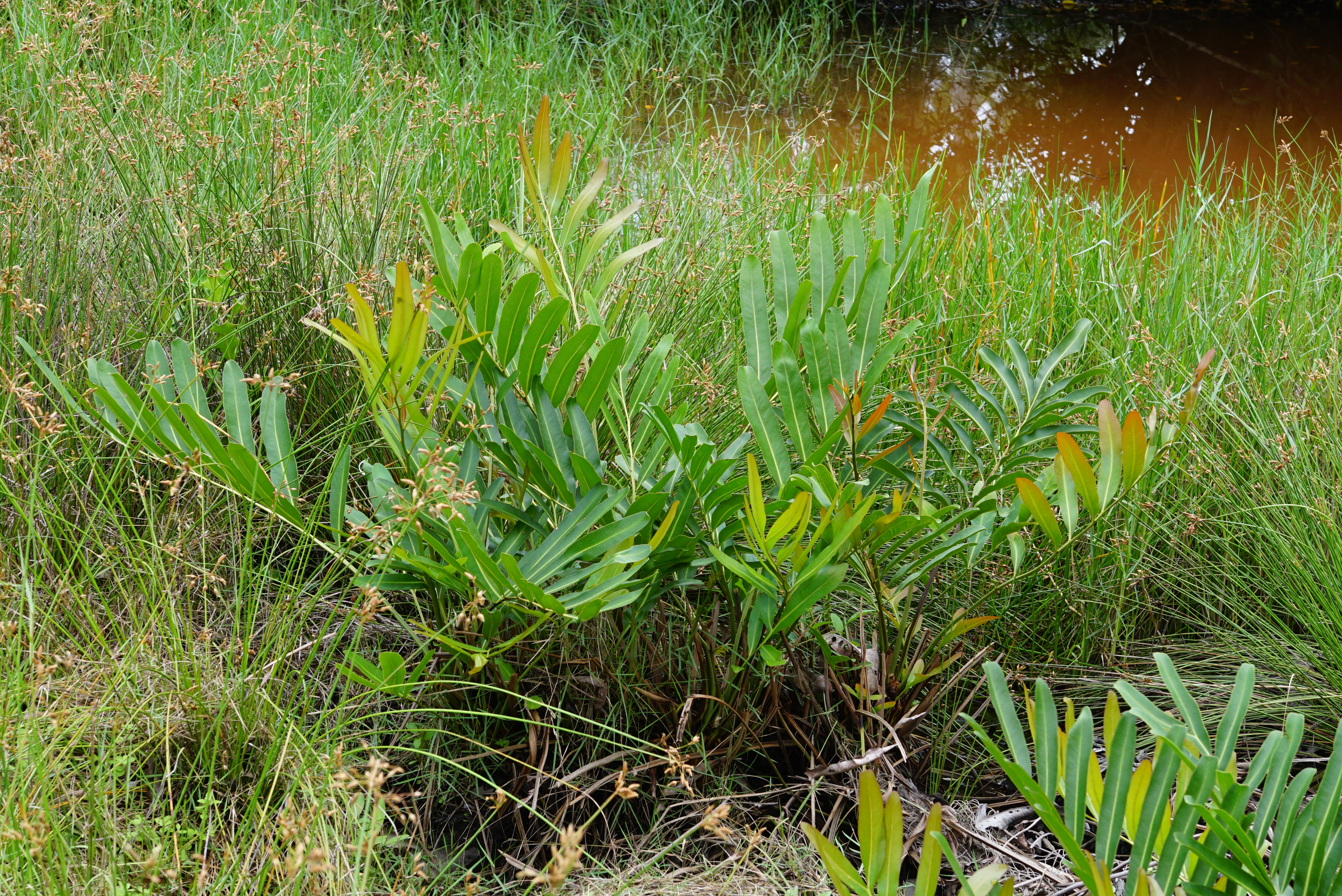
The mangrove fern (Acrostichum aureum) can grow vigorously in disturbed areas of mangrove forest.

Mangrove forests are an important part of the cycling and storage of carbon in tropical coastal ecosystems. Knowing this, scientists seek to reconstruct the environment and investigate changes to the coastal ecosystem over thousands of years using sediment cores. However, an additional complication is the imported marine organic matter that also gets deposited in the sediment through the tidal flushing of mangrove forests.

Mangrove forests can decay into peat deposits because of fungal and bacterial processes as well as by the action of termites. It becomes peat in good geochemical, sedimentary, and tectonic conditions. The nature of these deposits depends on the environment and the types of mangroves involved. Termites process fallen leaf litter, root systems and wood from mangroves into peat to build their nests. Termites stabilise the chemistry of this peat and represent approximately 2% of above ground carbon storage in mangroves. As the nests are buried over time this carbon is stored in the sediment, and the carbon cycle continues.

Mangroves are an important source of blue carbon. Globally, mangroves stored 4.19 Gt (9.2×10^{12} lb) of carbon in 2012. Two percent of global mangrove carbon was lost between 2000 and 2012, equivalent to a maximum potential of 0.316996250 Gt (6.9885710×10^{11} lb) of CO_{2} emissions. Globally, mangroves have been shown to provide measurable economic protections to coastal communities affected by tropical storms.

== Biodiversity ==
=== Birds ===
Heterogeneity in landscape ecology is a measure of how different parts of a landscape are from one another. It can manifest in an ecosystem from the abiotic or biotic characteristics of the environment. For example, coastal mangrove forests are located at the land-sea interface, so their functioning is influenced by abiotic factors such as tides, as well as biotic factors such as the extent and configuration of adjacent vegetation. For forest birds, tidal inundation means that the availability of many mangrove resources fluctuates daily, suggesting foraging flexibility is likely to be important. Mangroves also offer estuarine prey items, such as mudskippers and crabs, that are not found in terrestrial forest types. Further, mangroves are often situated in a complex mosaic of adjacent vegetation types such as grasslands, saltmarshes, and woodlands, and this can mean that flexibility in foraging strategy and choice of foraging habitat may be advantageous for highly mobile forest birds. Relative to other forest types, mangroves support few bird species that are obligate habitat (mangrove) specialists and instead host many species with generalised foraging niches.

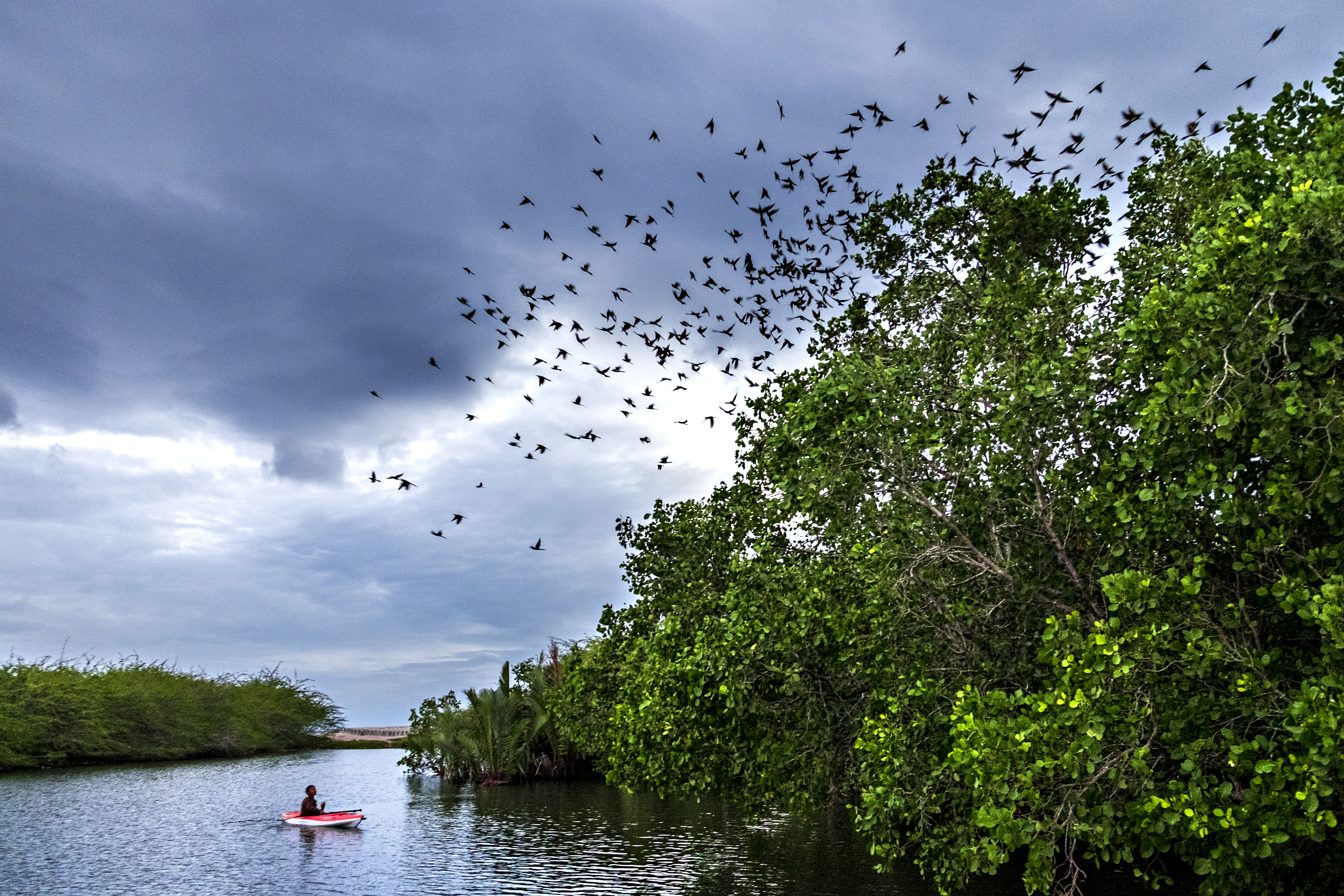
Mangrove forests host many bird species with generalised foraging niches

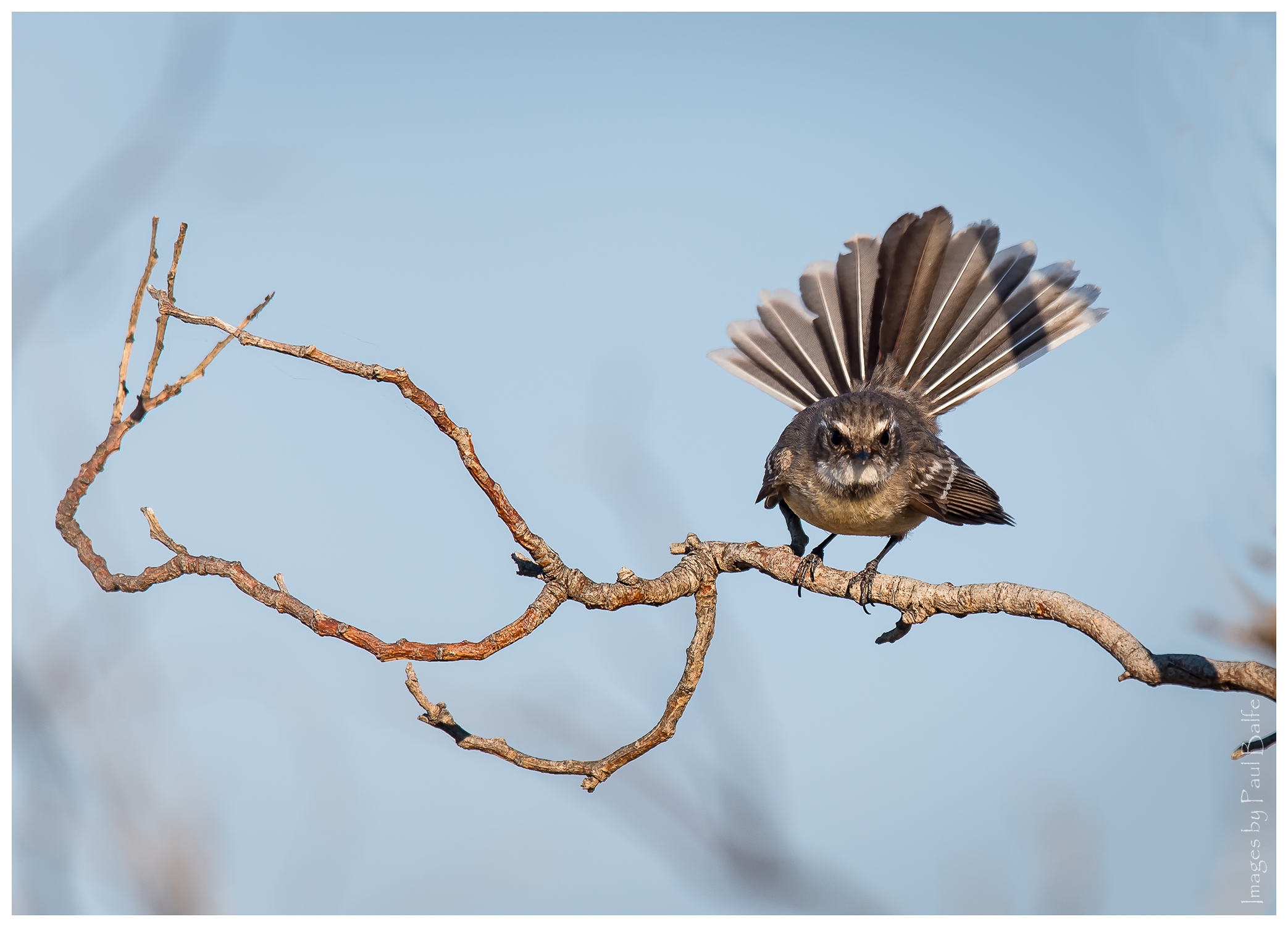
Mangrove fantail

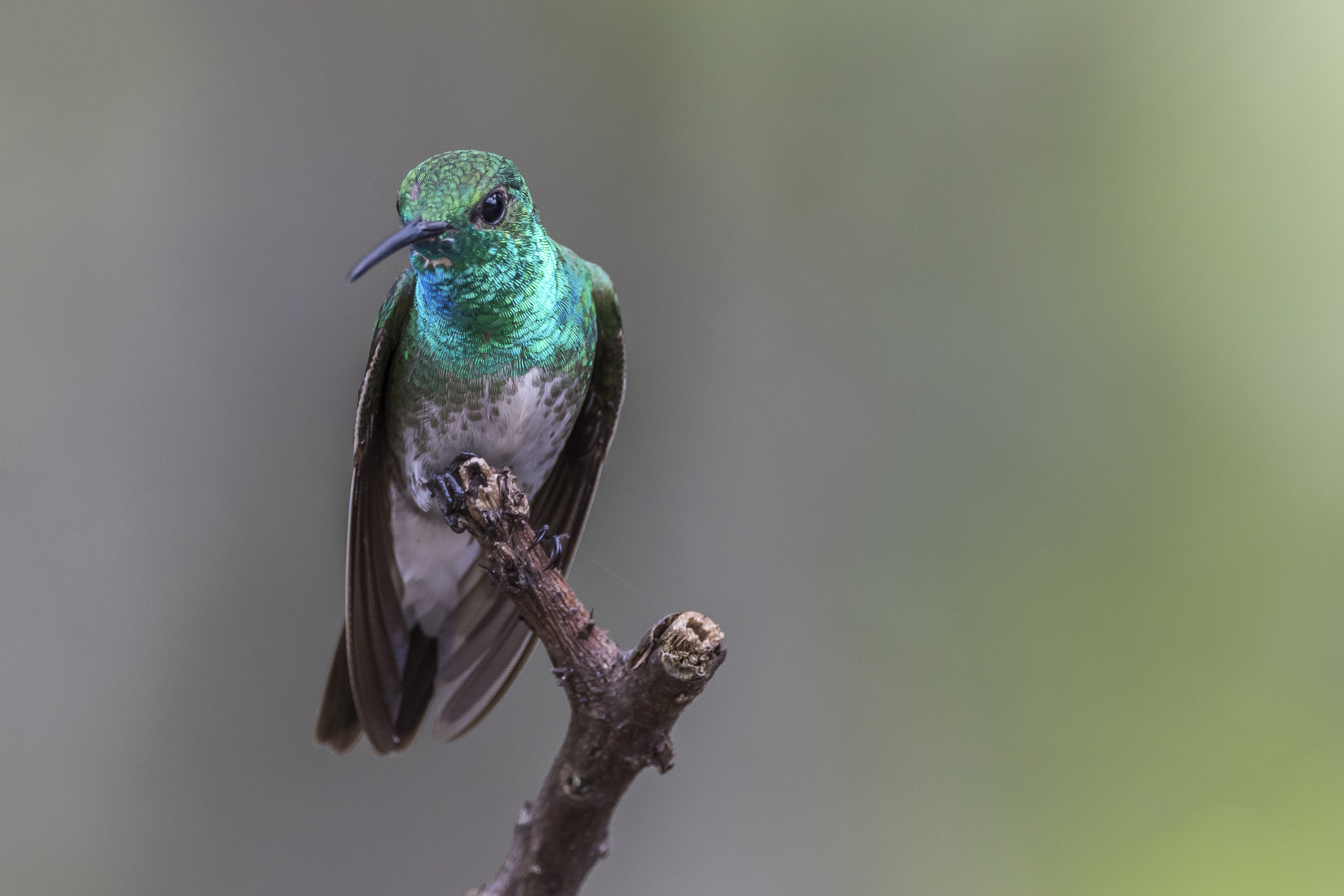
Mangrove hummingbird

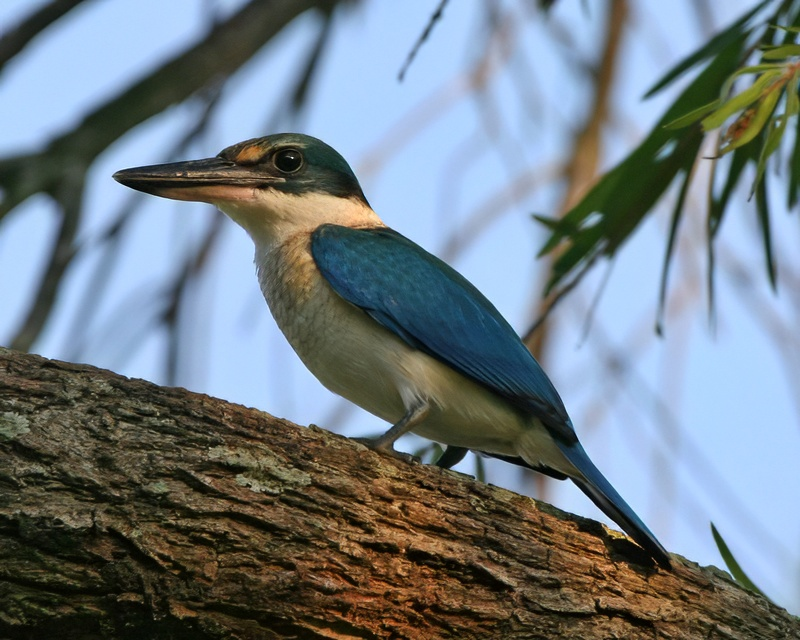
Mangrove kingfishers are found particularly in mangrove zones

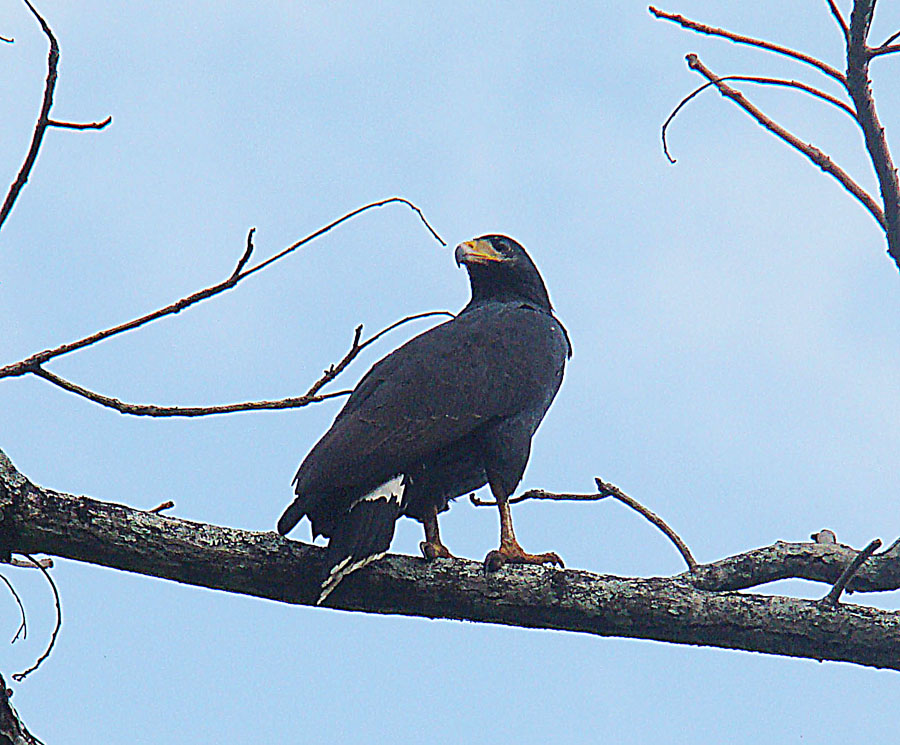
Mangrove black hawk

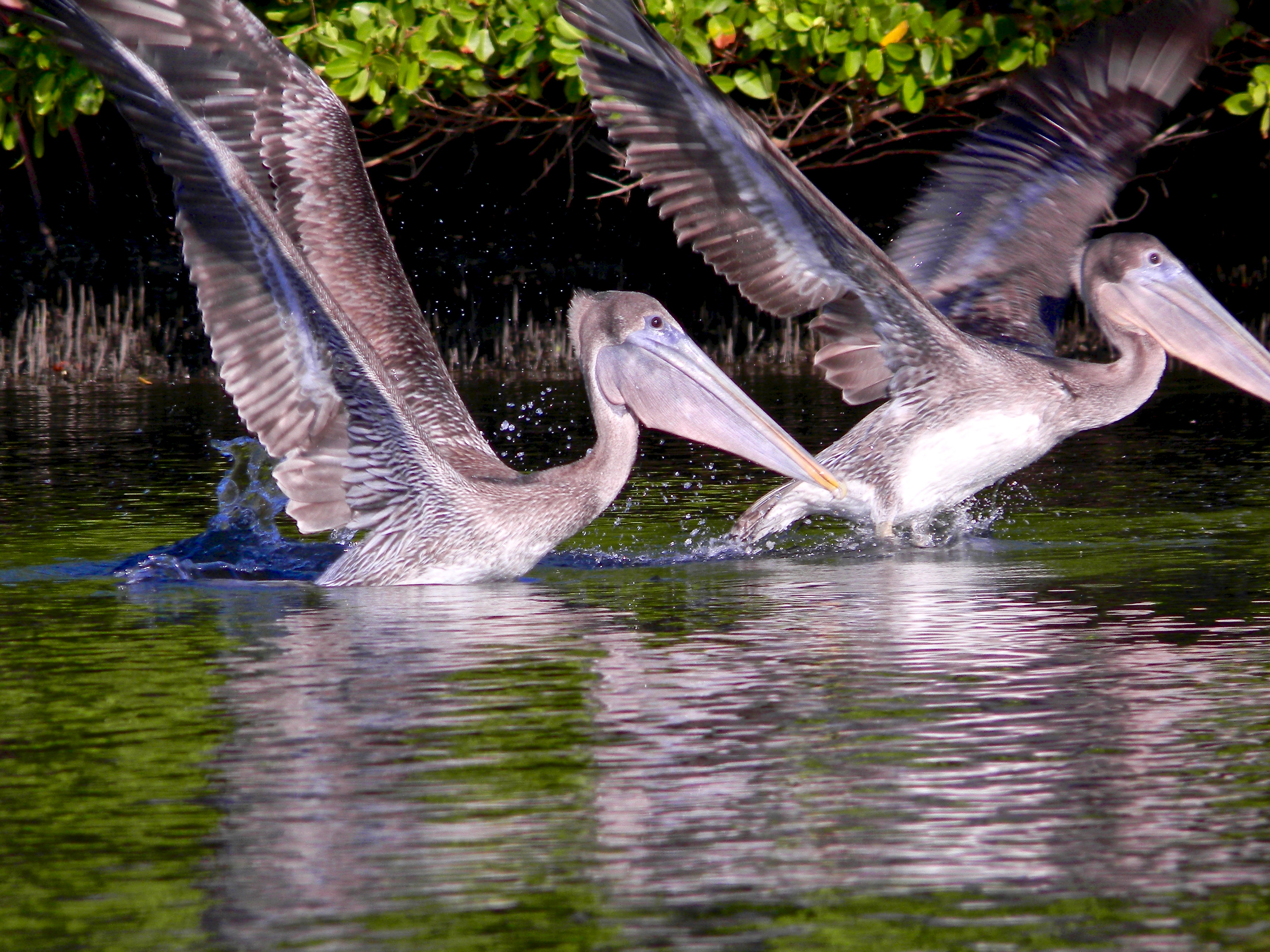
Brown pelicans fish and nest in mangrove forests

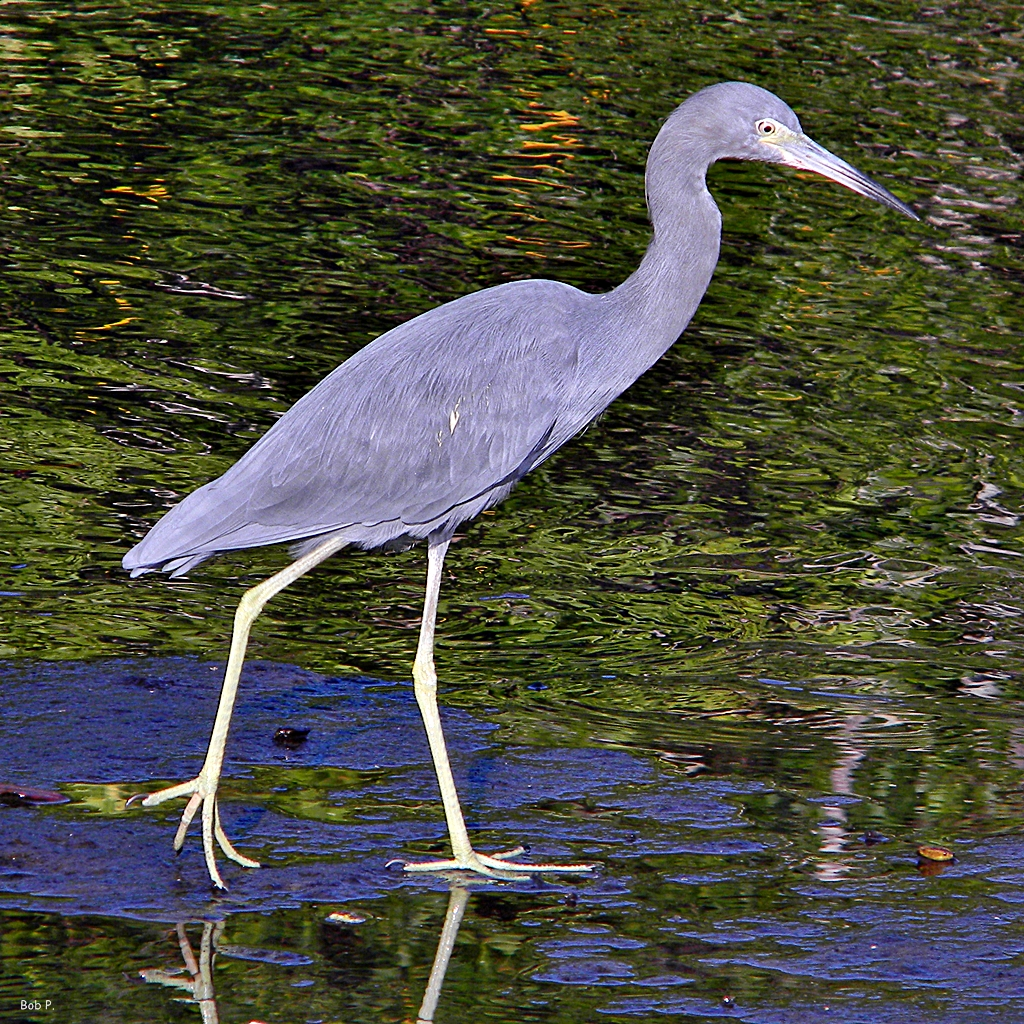
Little blue heron. The water is reflecting green mangrove trees.

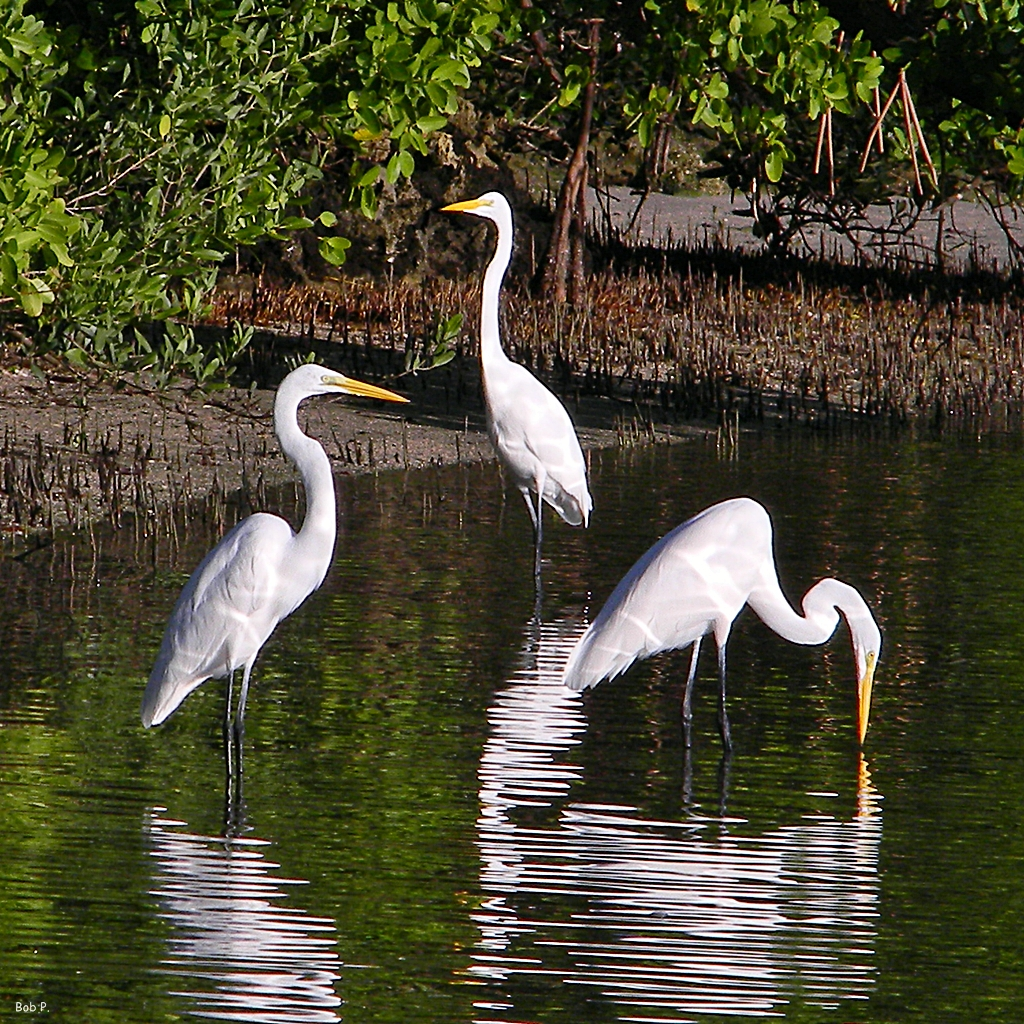
Three great egrets fishing along a mangrove shore

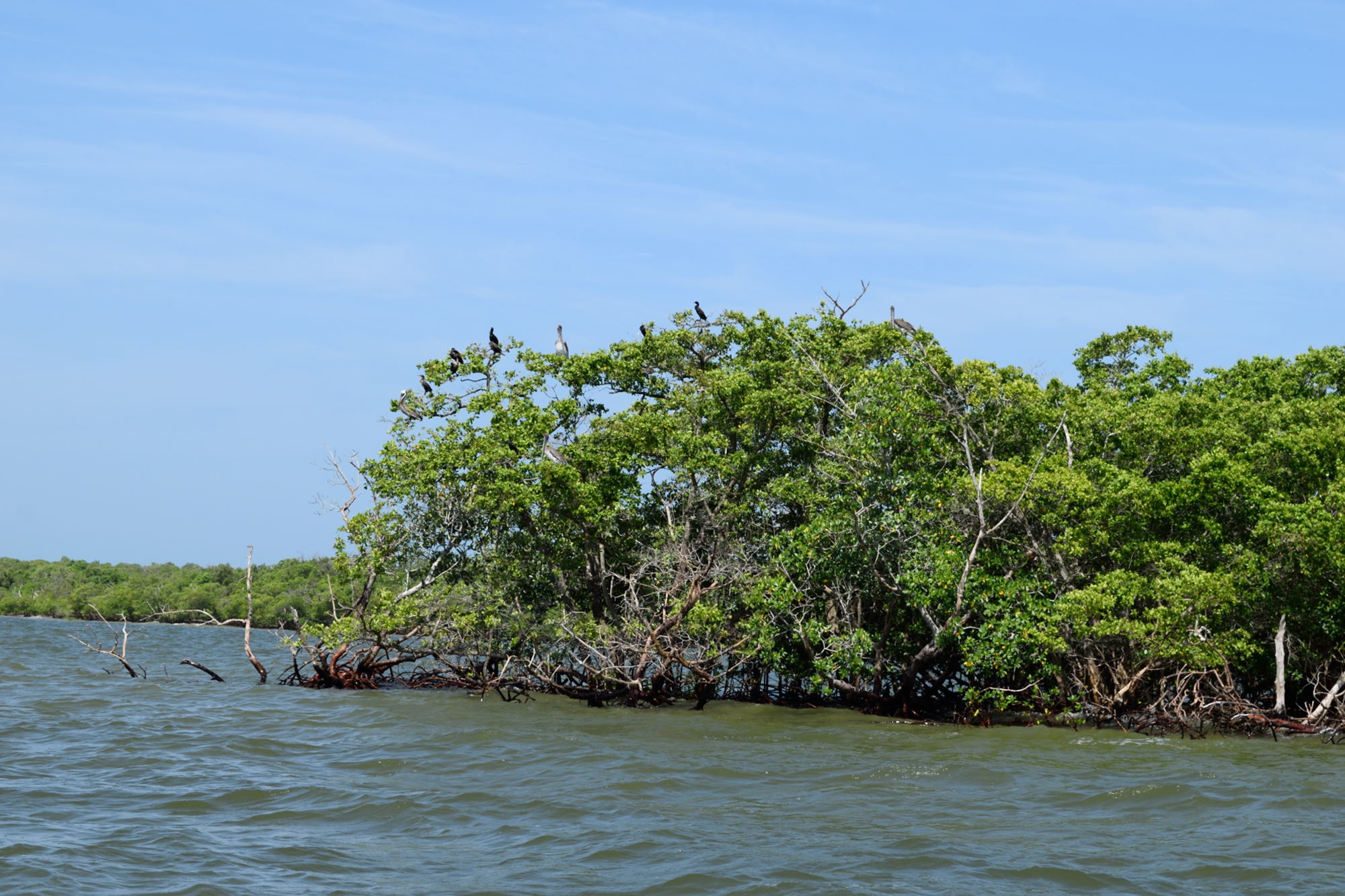
Pelicans and cormorants high in the mangrove trees

Bird sanctuaries

Mangrove forests are home and sanctuaries for many of aquatic bird species, including:

- Pulicat Lake Bird Sanctuary
- Mangalavanam Bird Sanctuary
- Salim Ali Bird Sanctuary
- Pichavaram
- Coringa Wildlife Sanctuary
- Sundarbans National Park

=== Fish ===
The intricate root system of mangrove forests makes them attractive to adult fish seeking food and juvenile fish seeking shelter.

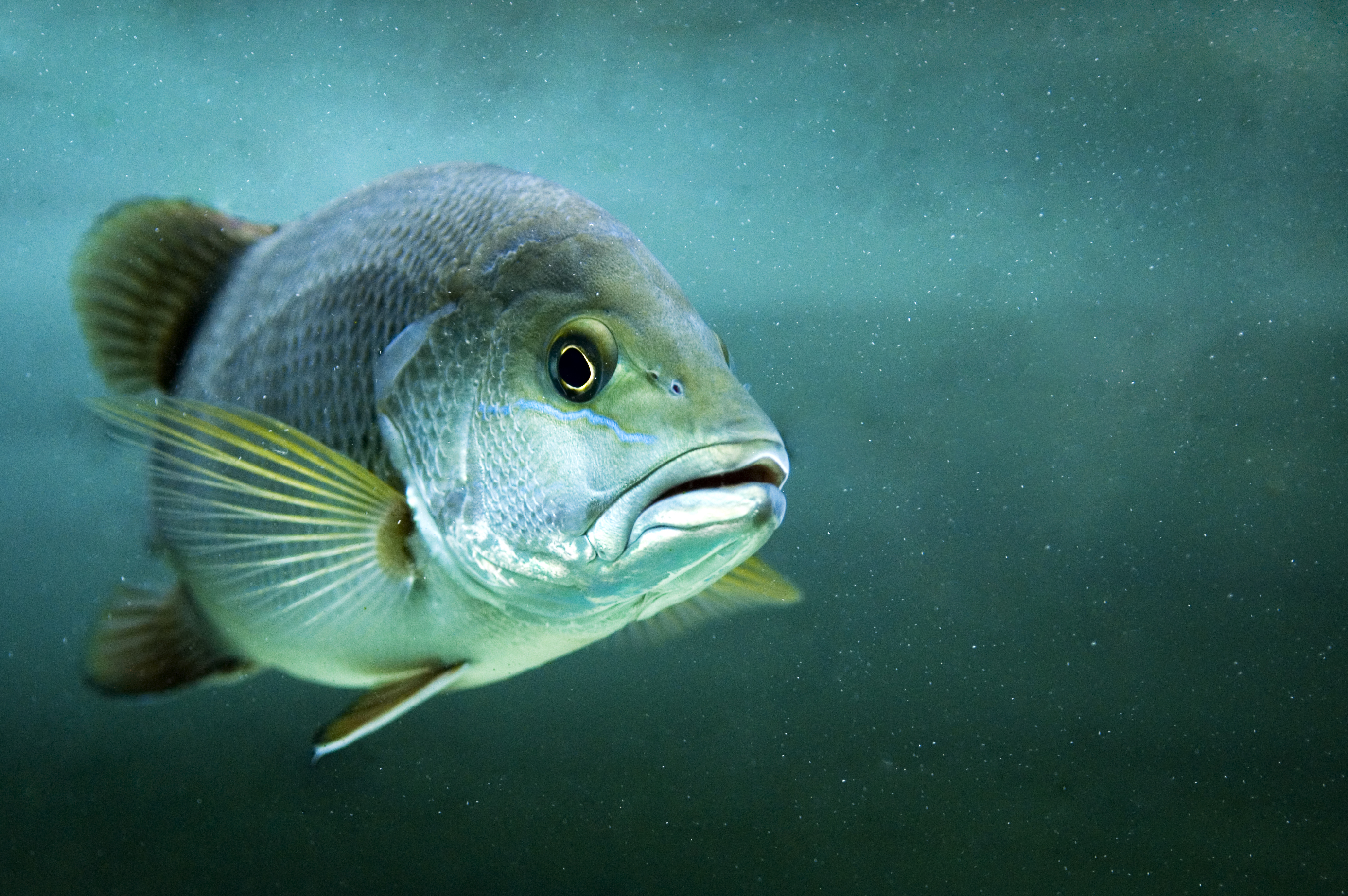
Mangrove jack

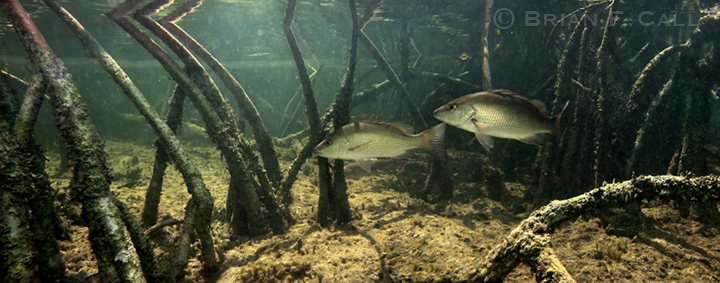
Mangrove snapper swimming among mangrove roots

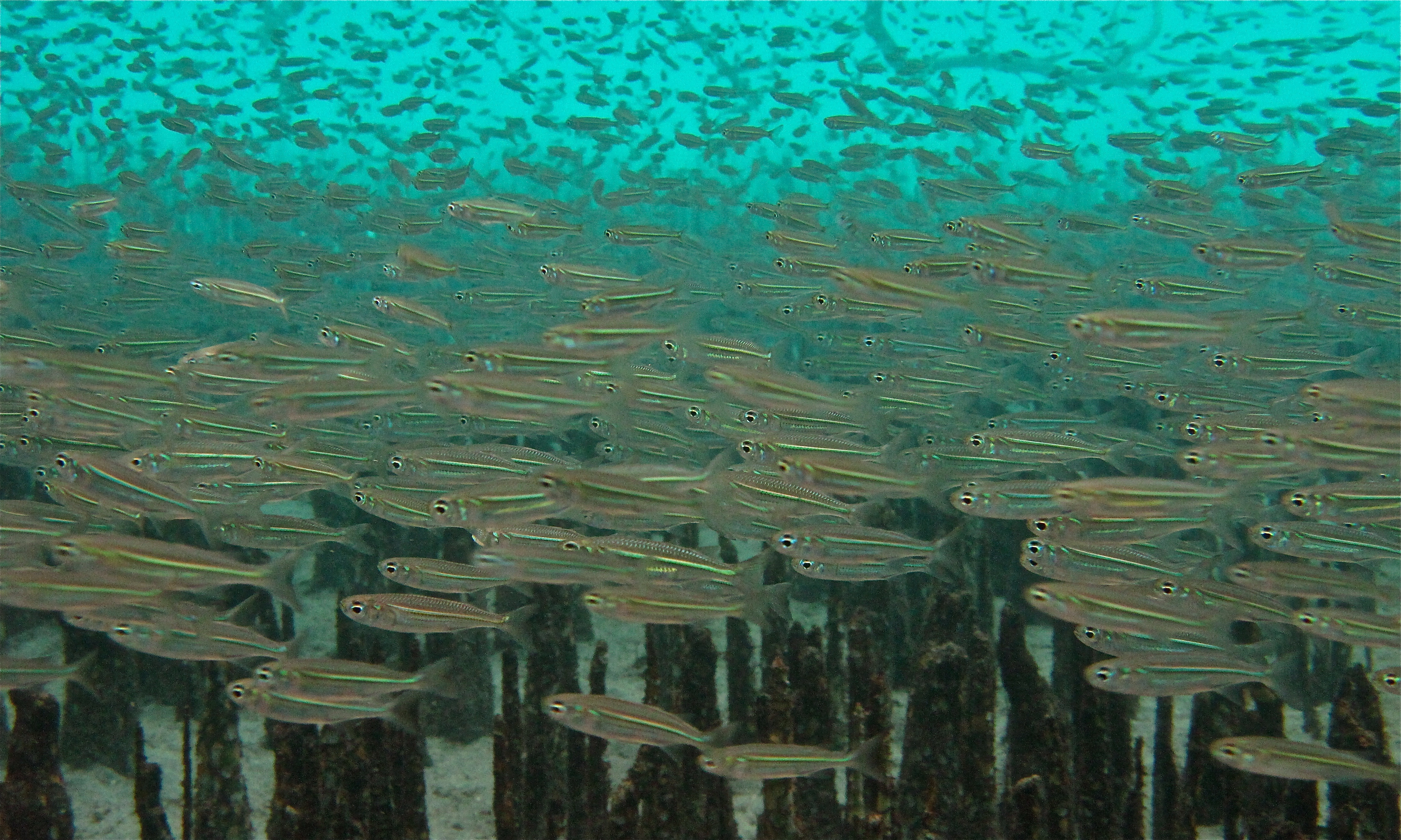
Old World silversides schooling among mangrove roots

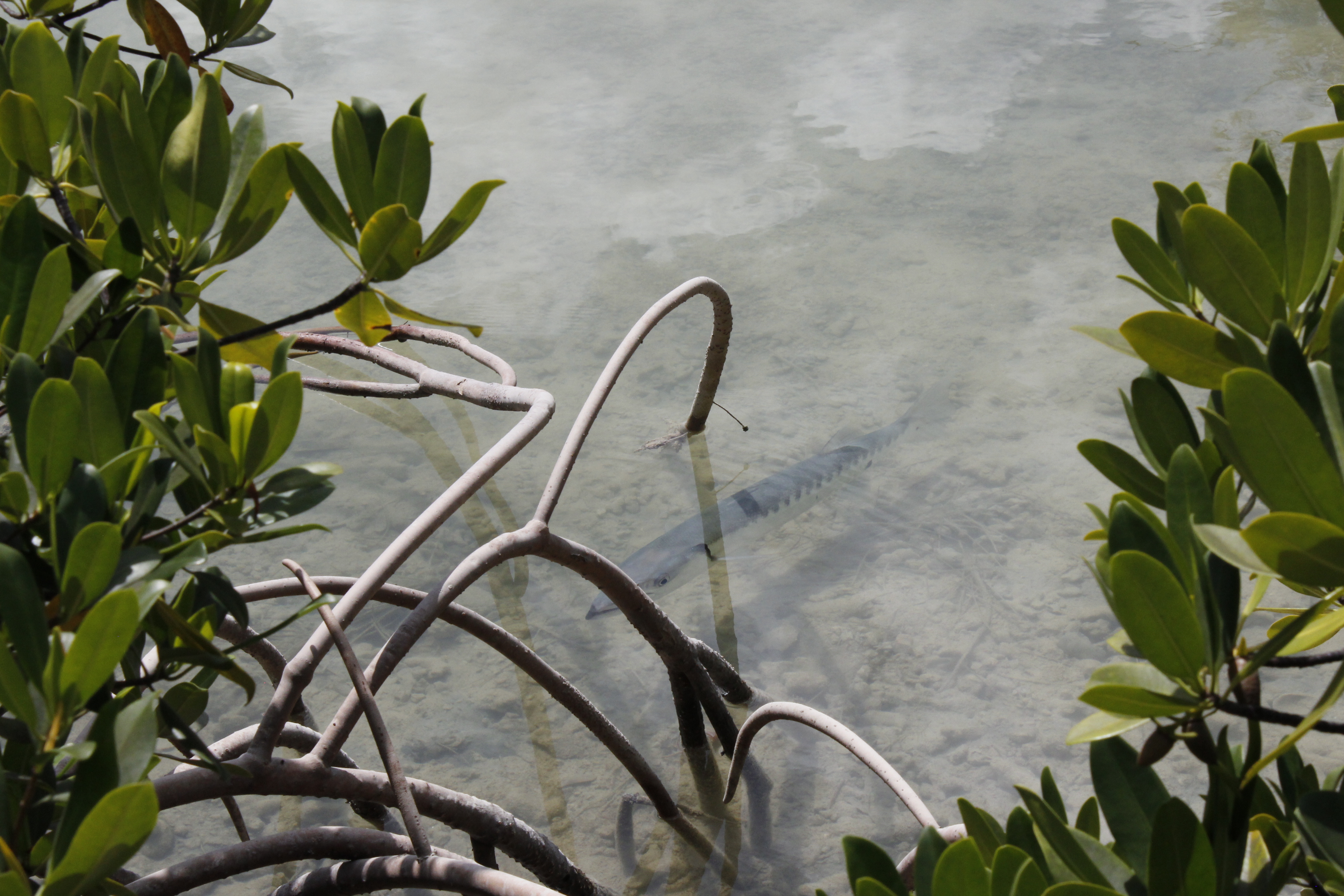
Barracuda lurks among mangrove root

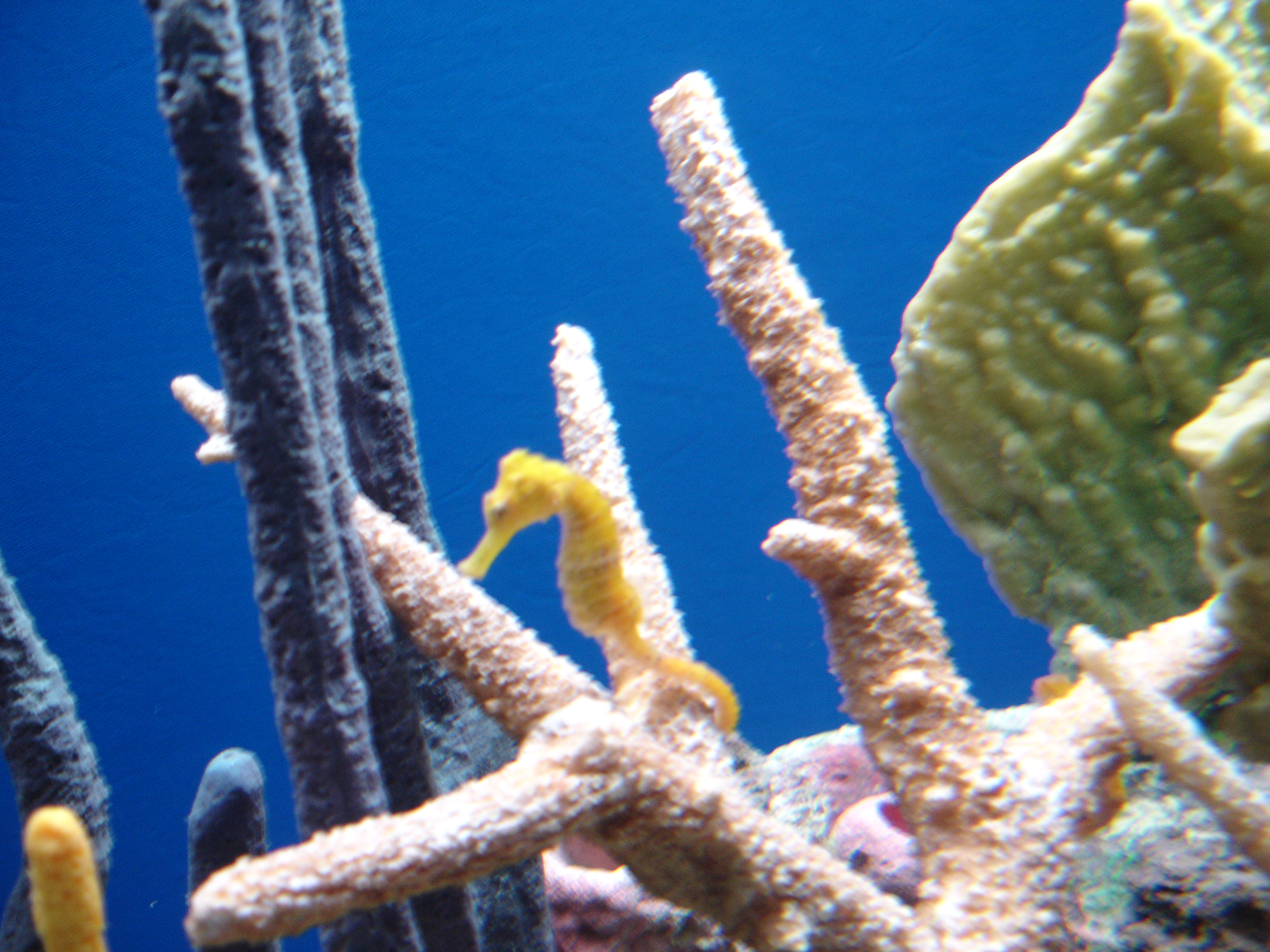
Yellow seahorses breed and give birth in Asia's flooded mangrove forests. Tangled roots and submerged branches offer shadowy shelter to pregnant dads and their offspring

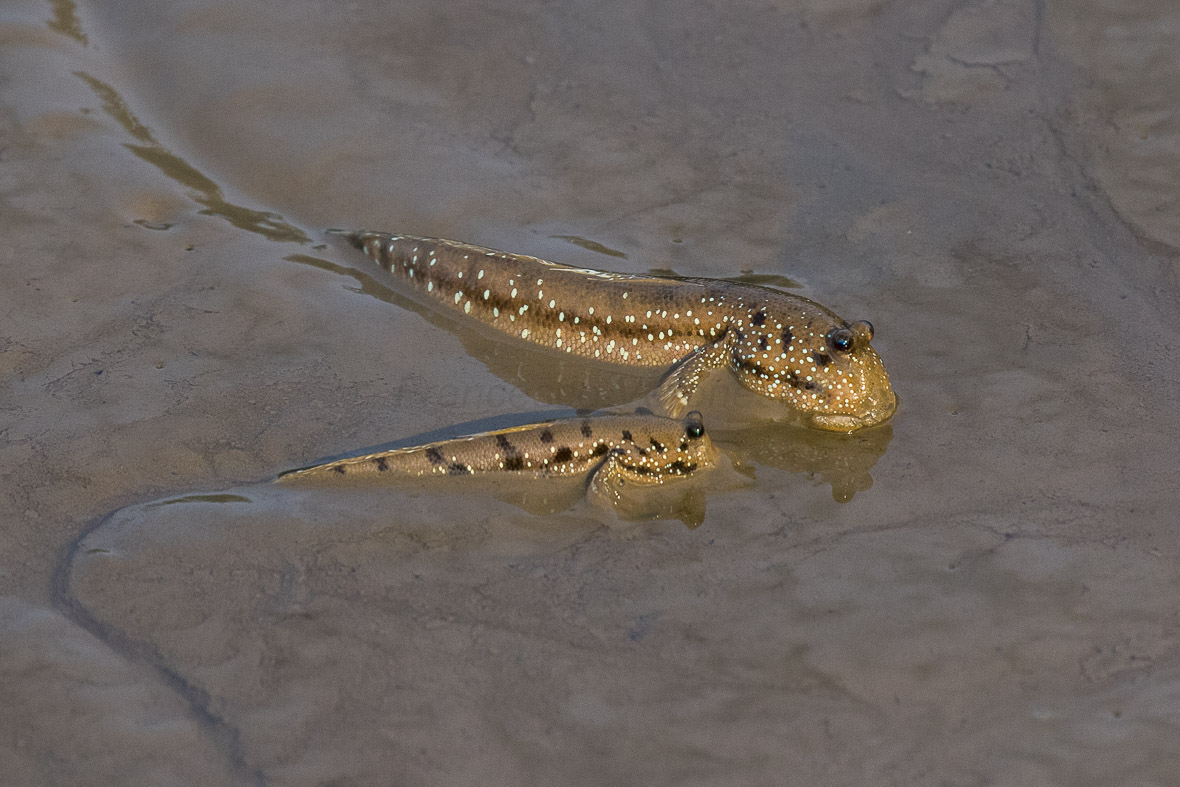
Mudskippers can be found in mangrove swamps

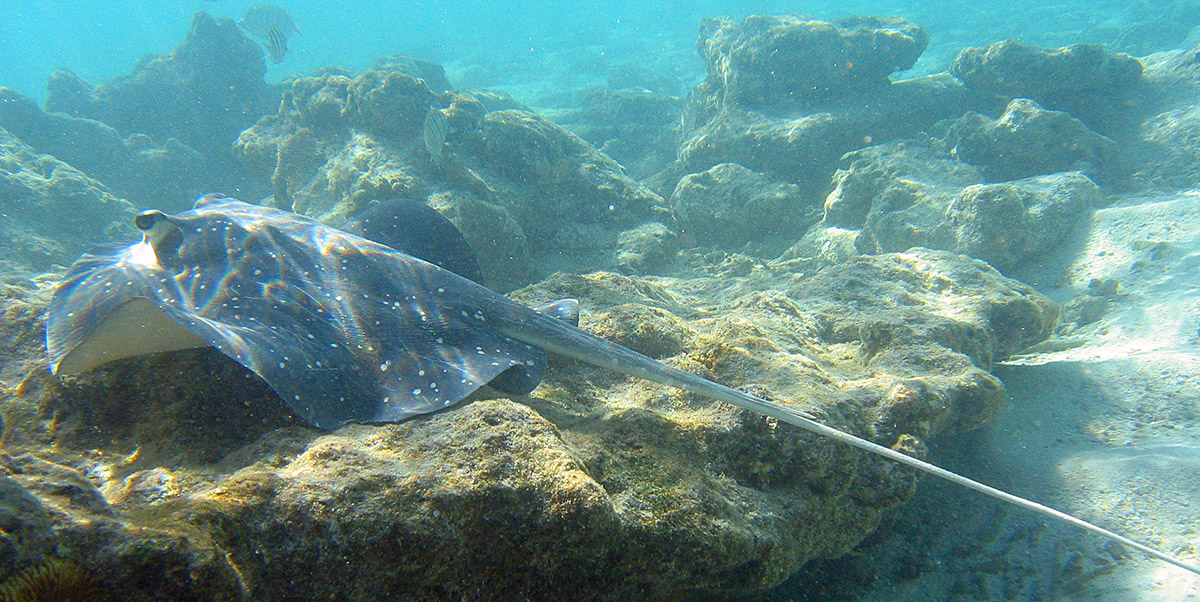
Mangrove whipray

=== Mangrove crabs and holobionts ===
Mangrove forests are among the more productive and diverse ecosystems on the planet, despite limited nitrogen availability. Under such conditions, animal-microbe associations (holobionts) are often key to ecosystem functioning. An example is the role of fiddler crabs and their carapace-associated microbial biofilm as hotspots of microbial nitrogen transformations and sources of nitrogen within the mangrove ecosystem.

Among coastal ecosystems, mangrove forests are of great importance as they account for three quarters of the tropical coastline and provide different ecosystem services. Mangrove ecosystems generally act as a net sink of carbon, although they release organic matter to the sea in the form of dissolved refractory macromolecules, leaves, branches and other debris. In pristine environments, mangroves are among the most productive ecosystems on the planet, despite growing in tropical waters that are often nutrient depleted. The refractory nature of the organic matter produced and retained in mangroves can slow the recycling of nutrients, particularly of nitrogen. Nitrogen limitation in such systems may be overcome by microbial nitrogen fixation when combined with high rates of bioturbation by macrofauna, such as crabs and lobsters.

Bioturbation by macrofauna affect nitrogen availability and multiple nitrogen related microbial processes through sediment reworking, burrow construction and bioirrigation, feeding and excretion. Macrofauna mix old and fresh organic matter, extend oxic–anoxic sediment interfaces, increase the availability of energy-yielding electron acceptors and increase nitrogen turnover via direct excretion. Thus, macrofauna may alleviate nitrogen limitation by priming the remineralisation of refractory nitrogen (that is, the nitrogen that can't be biologically decomposed), reducing plant-microbe competition. Such activity ultimately promotes nitrogen recycling, plant assimilation and high nitrogen retention, as well as favours its loss by stimulating coupled nitrification and denitrification.

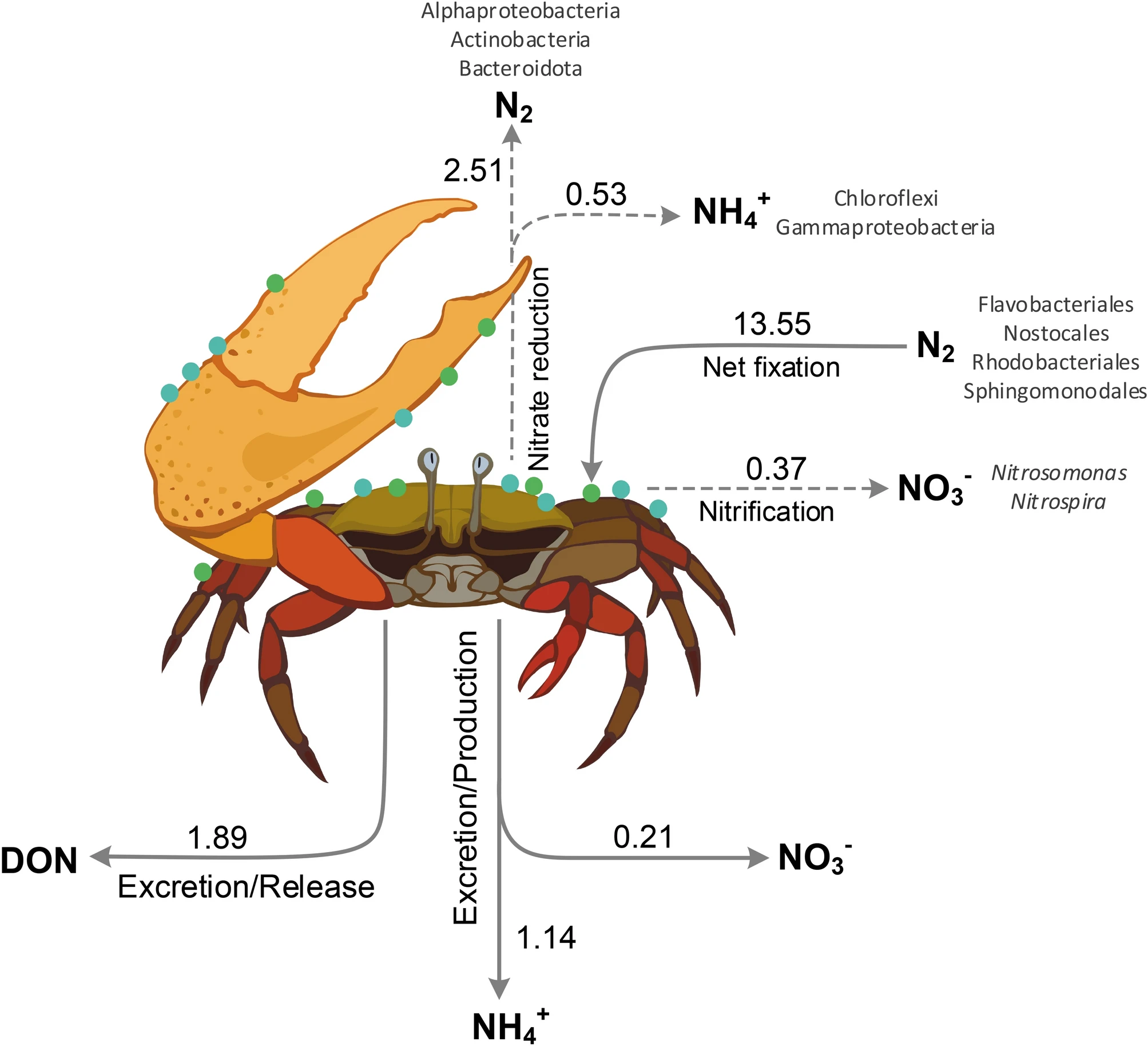
Nitrogen cycling in a mangrove fiddler crab holobiont Dry weight of crab biofilm and mean dry weight of incubated crab expressed as μmol nitrogen per crab per day

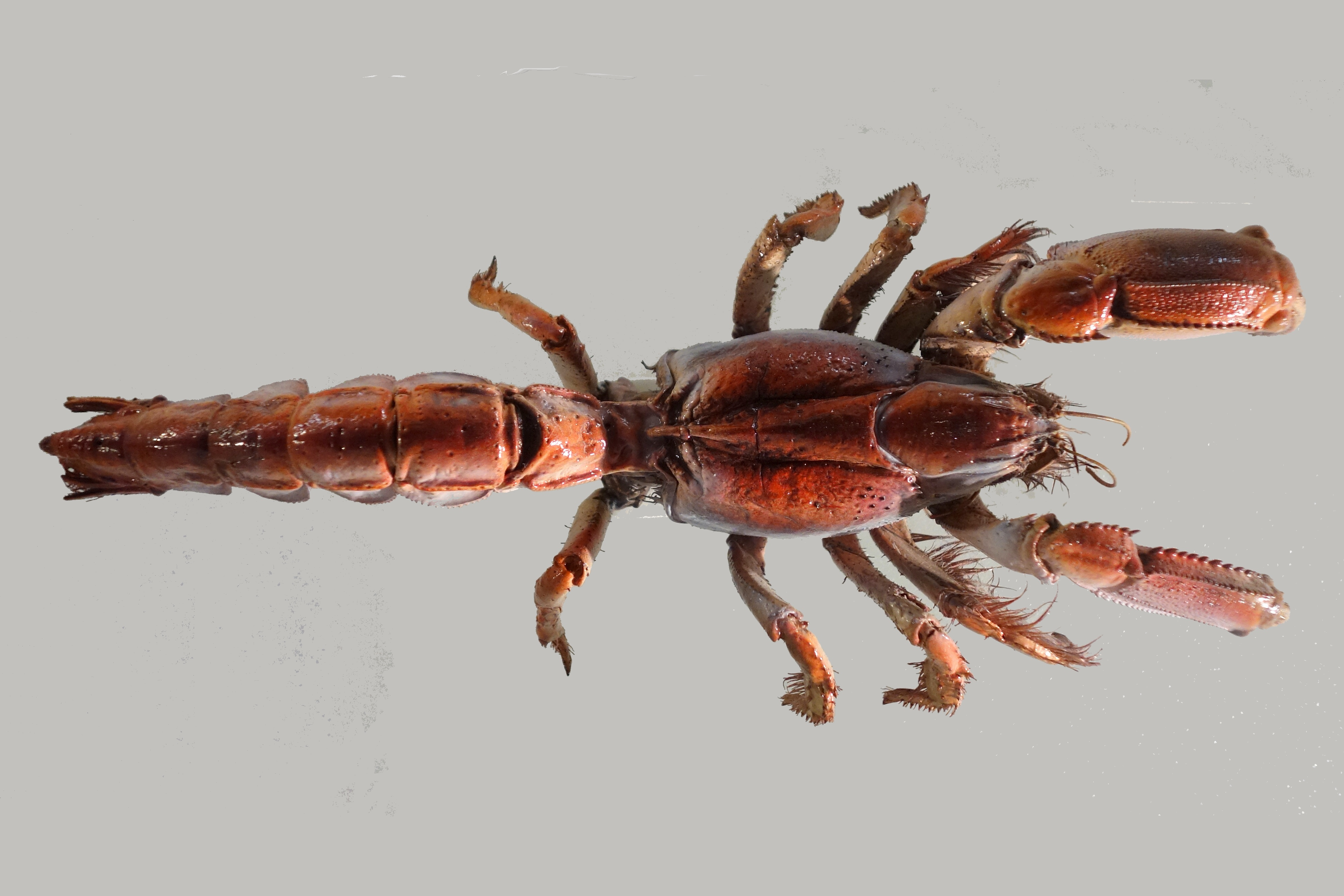
The scorpion mud lobster is found in some mangrove swamps. It lives in burrows up to 2 m (6.6 ft) deep, and is active at night. Its burrowing is important for the recycling of nutrients, bringing organic matter up from deep sediments.

Mangrove sediments are highly bioturbated by decapods such as crabs. Crab populations continuously rework sediment by constructing burrows, creating new niches, transporting or selectively grazing on sediment microbial communities. In addition, crabs can affect organic matter turnover by assimilating leaves and producing finely fragmented faeces, or by carrying them into their burrows. Therefore, crabs are considered important ecosystem engineers shaping biogeochemical processes in intertidal muddy banks of mangroves. In contrast to burrowing polychaetes or amphipods, the abundant Ocipodid crabs, mainly represented by fiddler crabs, do not permanently ventilate their burrows. These crabs may temporarily leave their burrows for surface activities, or otherwise plug their burrow entrance during tidal inundation in order to trap air. A recent study showed that these crabs can be associated with a diverse microbial community, either on their carapace or in their gut.

The exoskeleton of living animals, such as shells or carapaces, offers a habitat for microbial biofilms which are actively involved in different N-cycling pathways such as nitrification, denitrification and dissimilatory nitrate reduction to ammonium (DNRA). Colonizing the carapace of crabs may be advantageous for specific bacteria, because of host activities such as respiration, excretion, feeding and horizontal and vertical migrations. However, the ecological interactions between fiddler crabs and bacteria, their regulation and significance as well as their implications at scales spanning from the single individual to the ecosystem are not well understood.

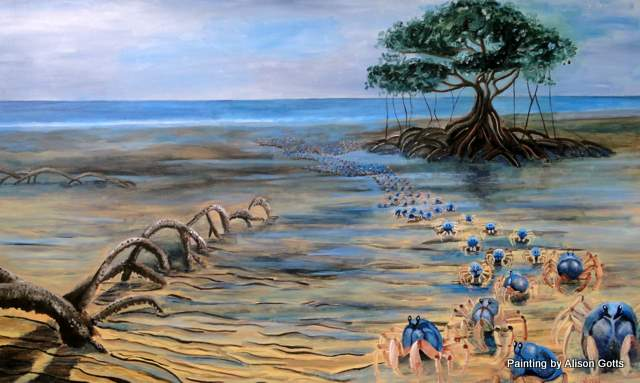
Artist impression of small blue soldier crabs marching across a mangrove flat

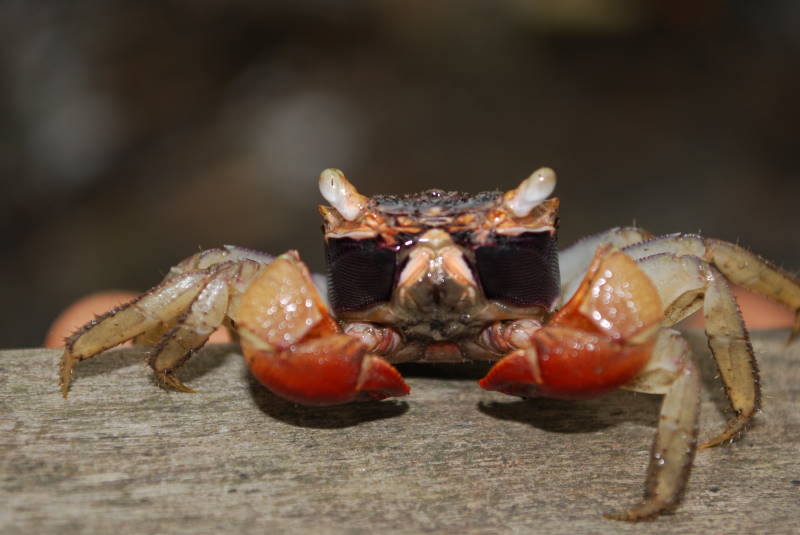
Mangrove crab, possibly Neosarmatium asiaticum

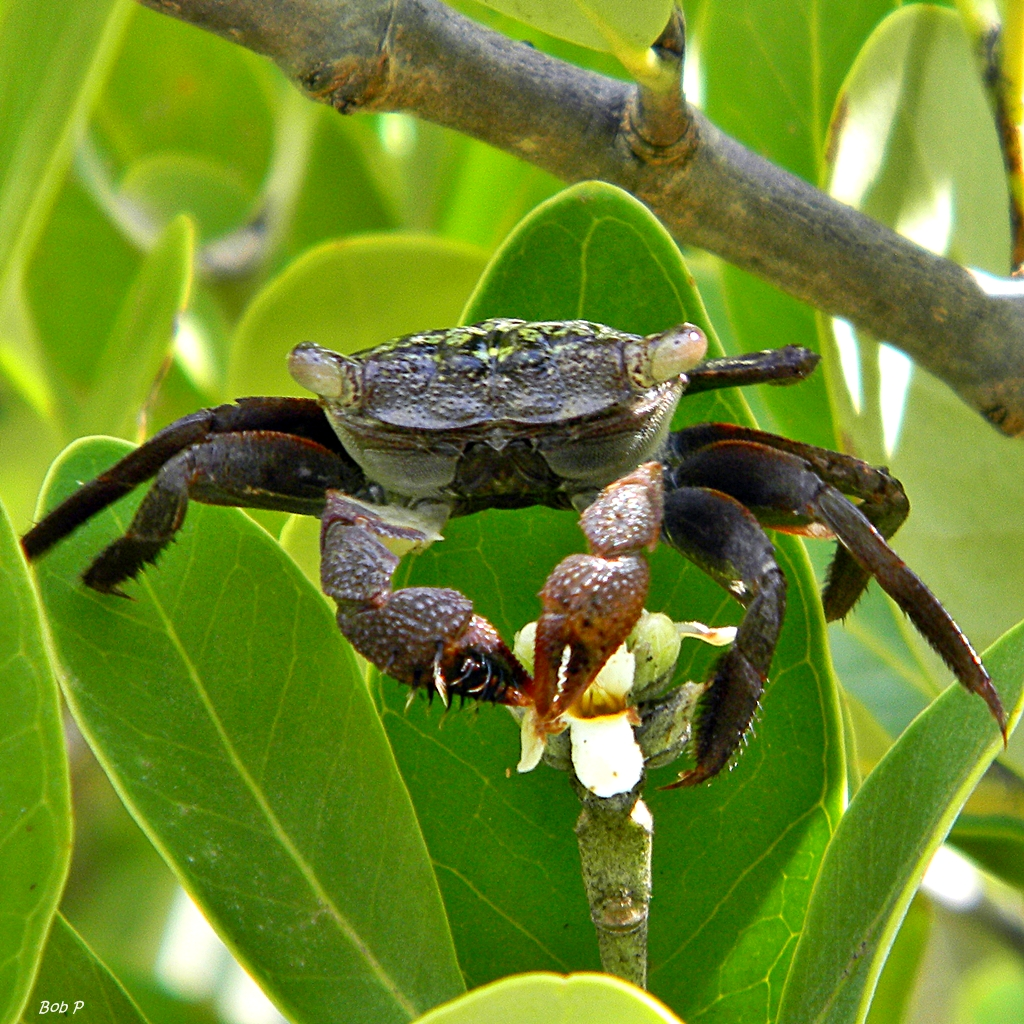
Mangrove tree crab, Aratus pisonii

== Biogeochemistry ==
=== Carbon cycle ===
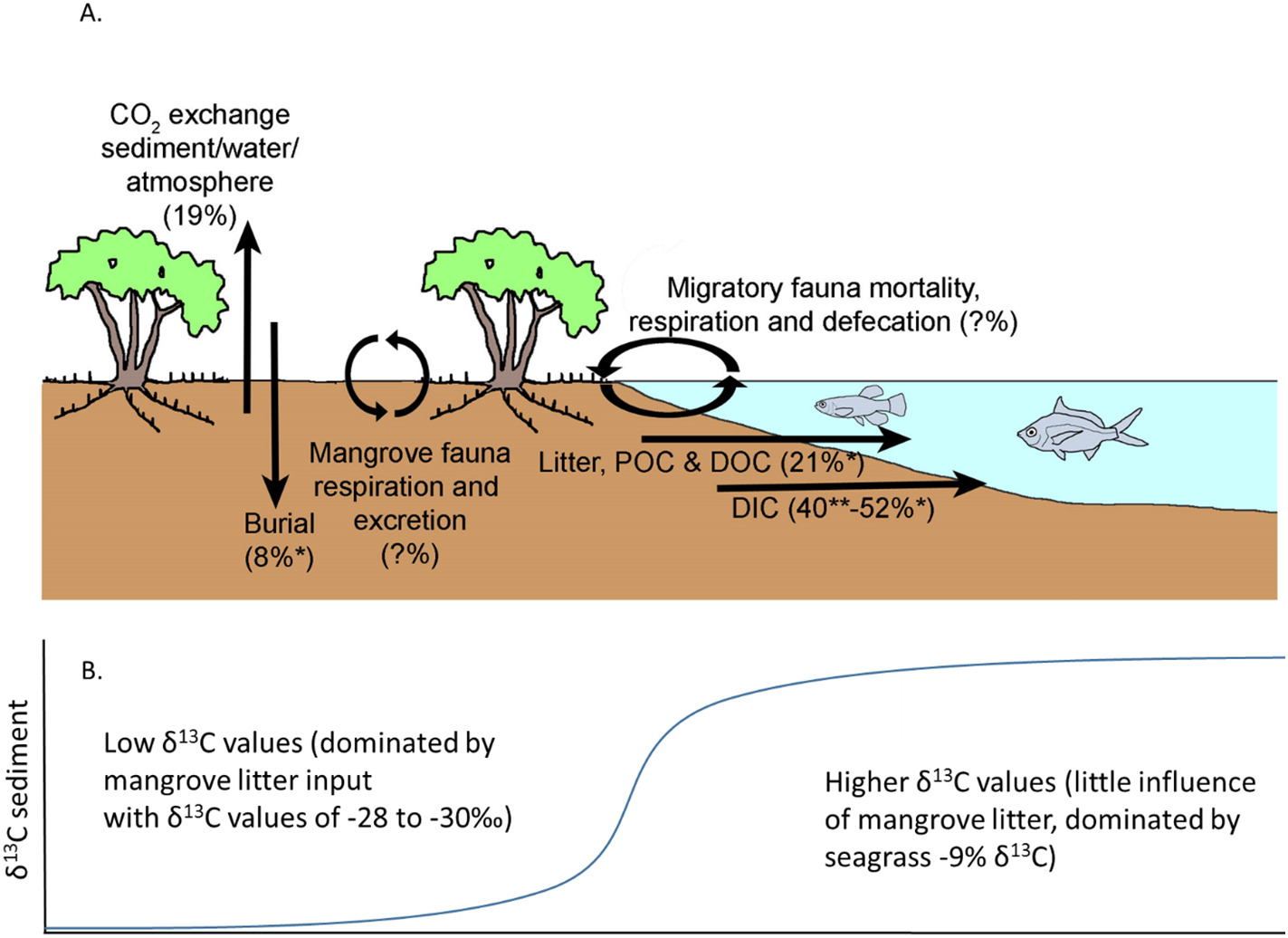
Fate of mangrove primary production A.) Fate of mangrove primary production and importance of each component, as a percentage of net mangrove primary productivity. B.) Isotopic profile of sediments across the transition from mangrove to intertidal mudflats and seagrass beds, illustrating the retention of mangrove productivity within the forest.

Mangrove forests are amongst the world's most productive marine ecosystems, with net primary productivity (NPP) in the order of 208 Tg C yr^{−1}. Mangrove forests achieve a steady state once the forest reaches maximum biomass at around 20–30 years through a constant process of mortality and renewal so, assuming the living biomass is not becoming more carbon dense, then carbon has to be lost at a rate equal to the amount of carbon fixed as NPP. Hence this productivity is either retained within the mangrove forest, as a standing stock of live material such as wood, buried in sediments, or exported to neighbouring habitats as litter, particulate and dissolved organic carbon (POC and DOC) and dissolved inorganic carbon (DIC), or lost to the atmosphere.

The outwelling hypothesis argues that export of locally derived POC and DOC is an important ecosystem function of mangroves, which drives detrital based food webs in adjacent coastal habitats. Export of mangrove carbon has been estimated to make a significant trophic contribution to adjacent ecosystems. The theory of outwelling is supported by mass balance evaluations that show the amount of carbon fixed by mangroves normally greatly exceeds the amount stored within the forest, although the scale of outwelling varies considerably between forests, due to differences in coastal geomorphology, tidal regimes, freshwater flow and productivity.

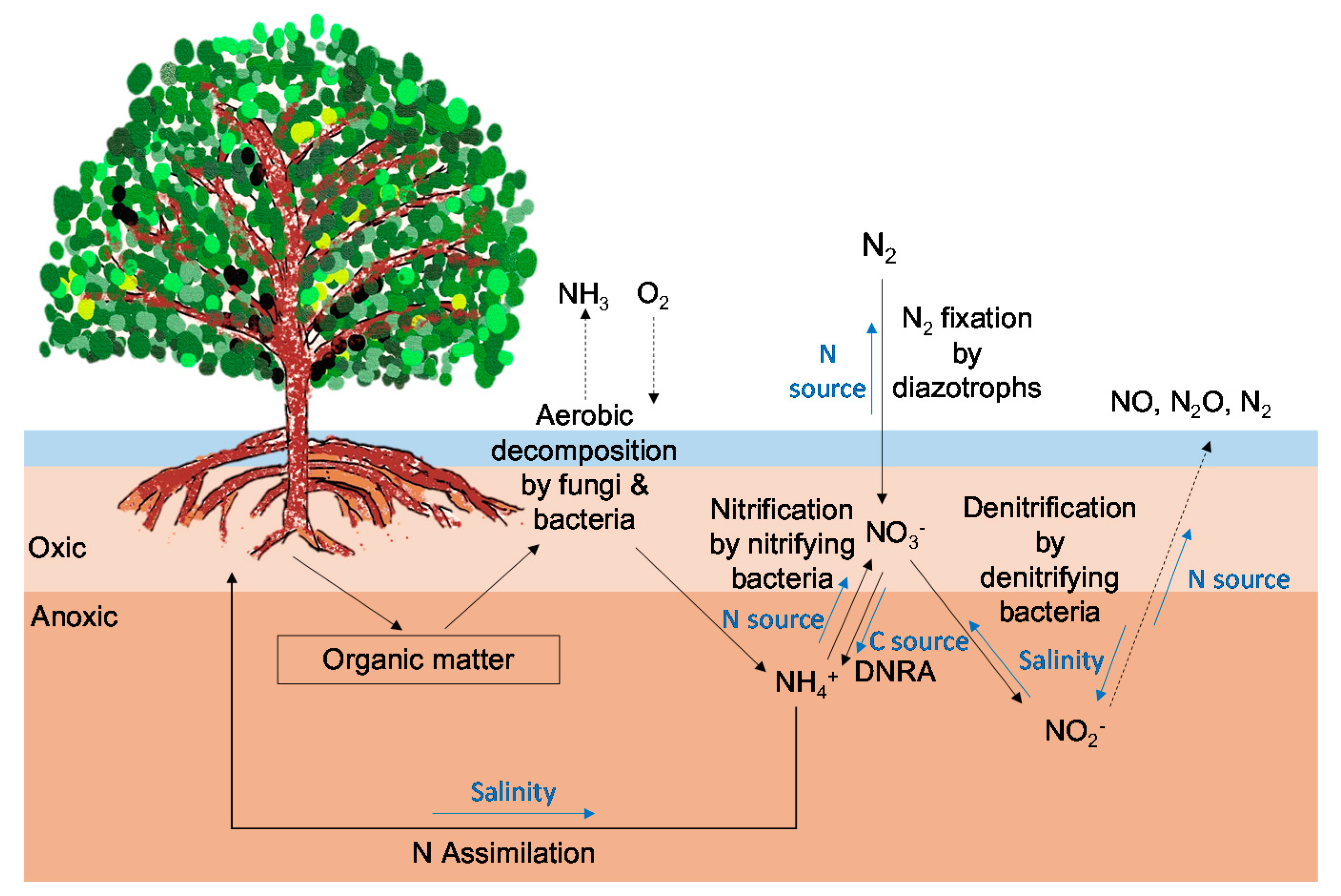
Pathways for the nitrogen cycle in mangrove forests Black arrows indicate nitrogen pathways. Blue arrows indicate the direction where increased environmental factors (salinity, carbon source, nitrogen source) may affect nitrogen pathways.

In the 1990s, global estimates could account for 48% of the total global mangrove primary production of 218 ± 72 million tons C yr^{−1} (see diagram on the right). By incorporating information on carbon burial, CO_{2} efflux and carbon outwelled as leaf litter, POC and DOC, the remaining 52% was thought outwelled as DIC, though there was insufficient data to confirm this. More recent assessments of DIC export at two sites in Australia supported the estimates of Bouillon et al. in 2008, although in 2014 Alongi suggested that only 40% of NPP was exported as DIC.

=== Nitrogen assimilation ===
Mangrove forests and coastal marshes are typically considered N-limited ecosystems because of their high primary production. Therefore, mangrove plants are highly efficient at utilising soil nitrogen, making them an important sink for excess nitrogen from upstream. However, different mangrove species may still utilise nitrogen at different efficiencies, even though they share similar nitrogen pathways (see diagram on right). Reported nitrogen assimilation rates in mangrove plants ranged from 2 to 8 μmol g^{−1} h^{−1} under ambient nitrogen conditions, and 19 to 251 μmol g^{−1} h^{−1} when the nitrogen supply was unlimited.

In addition to species variation, different environmental conditions can also affect the nitrogen assimilation rates in mangrove plants. Because Cl^{−} ions can reduce protein synthesis and nitrogen assimilation, soil pore water salinity appears to be a negative factor that significantly alters the nitrogen uptake rates of mangrove plants.

== Exploitation and conservation ==
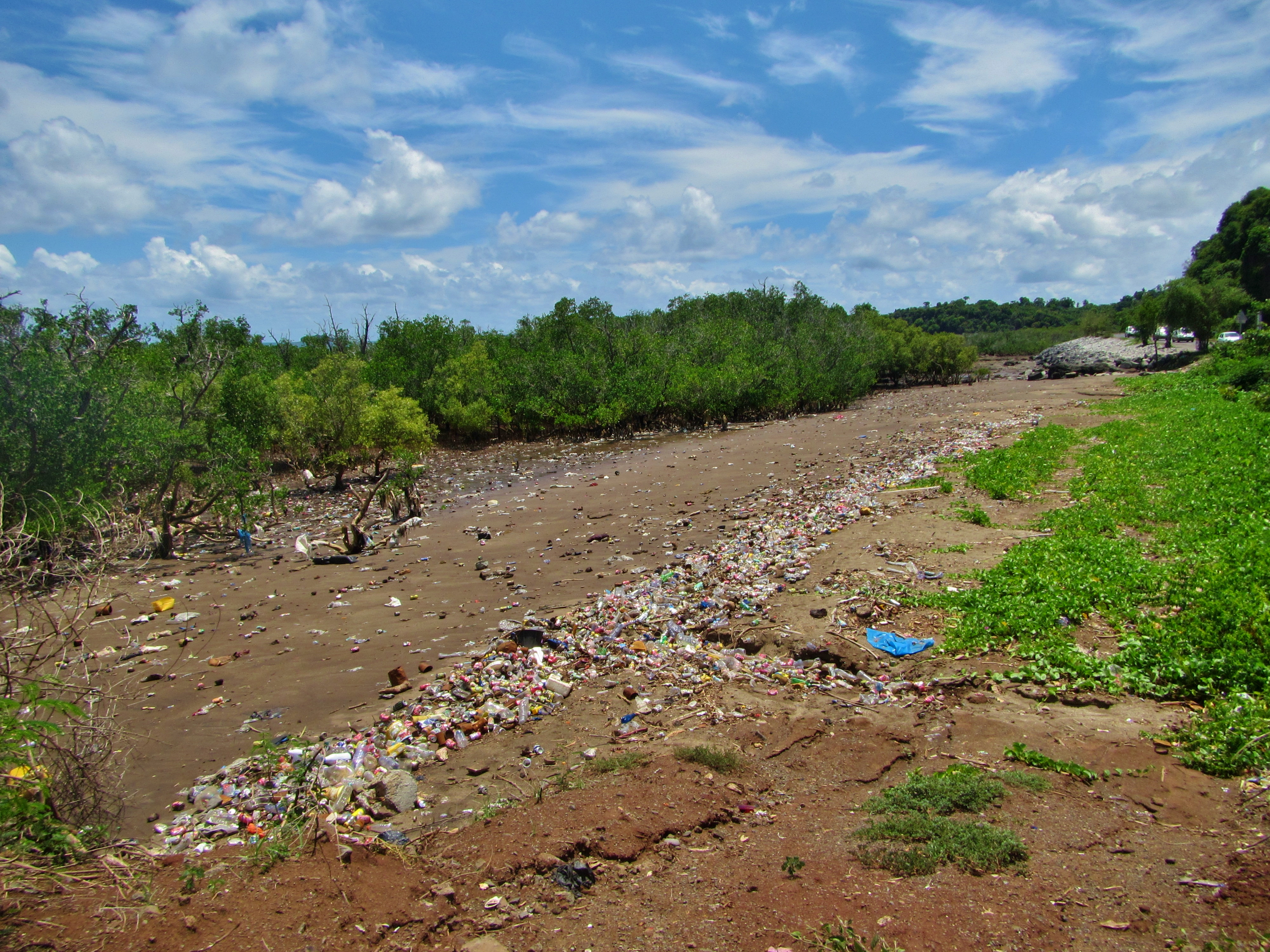
Mangrove roots act as a net, retaining waste. Mayotte at low tide

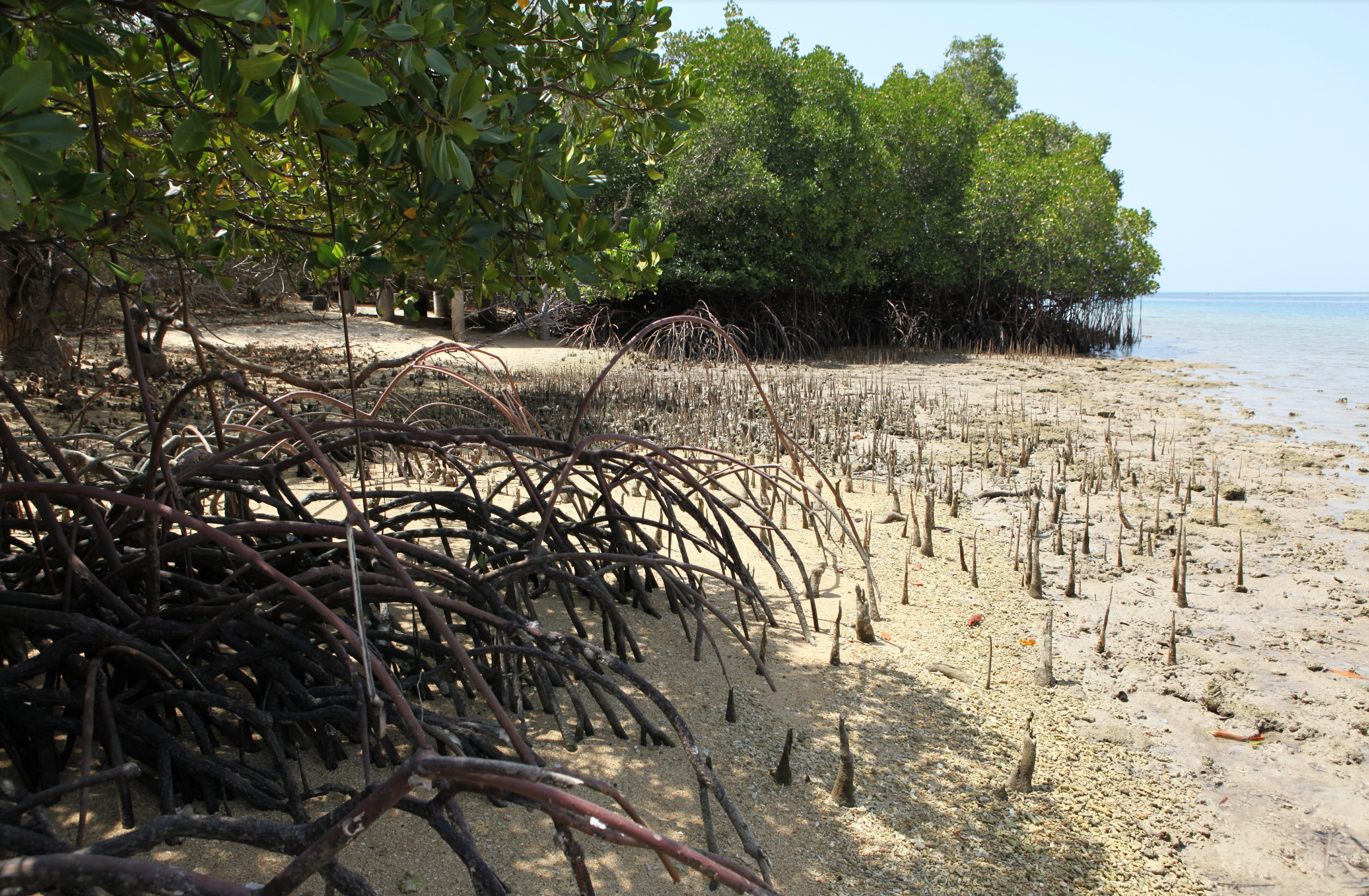
Mangroves in West Bali National Park, Indonesia

Adequate data is only available for about half of the global area of mangroves. However, of those areas for which data has been collected, it appears that 35% of the mangroves have been destroyed. Since the 1980s, around 2% of mangrove area is estimated to be lost each year. Assessments of global variation in mangrove loss indicates that national regulatory quality mediates how different drivers and pressures influence loss rates.

Shrimp farming causes approximately a quarter of the destruction of mangrove forests. Likewise, the 2010 update of the World Mangrove Atlas indicated that approximately one fifth of the world's mangrove ecosystems have been lost since 1980, although this rapid loss rate appears to have decreased since 2000 with global losses estimated at between 0.16% and 0.39% annually between 2000 and 2012. Despite global loss rates decreasing since 2000, Southeast Asia remains an area of concern with loss rates between 3.6% and 8.1% between 2000 and 2012. By far the most damaging form of shrimp farming is when a closed ponds system (non-integrated multi-trophic aquaculture) is used, as these require destruction of a large part of the mangrove, and use antibiotics and disinfectants to suppress diseases that occur in this system, and which may also leak into the surrounding environment. Far less damage occurs when integrated mangrove-shrimp aquaculture is used, as this is connected to the sea and subjected to the tides, and less diseases occur, and as far less mangrove is destroyed for it.

Grassroots efforts to protect mangroves from development and from citizens cutting down the mangroves for charcoal production, cooking, heating and as a building material are becoming more popular. Solar cookers are distributed by many non-government organizations as a low-cost alternative to wood and charcoal stoves. These may help in reducing the demand for charcoal.

- In Thailand, community management has been effective in restoring damaged mangroves. Also, production of mangrove honey is practiced, as a way to generate sustainable income for nearby people, keeping them from destroying the mangrove and generate a short-term revenue.
- In Madagascar, honey is also produced in mangroves as a source of (non-destructive) income generation. In addition, silk pods from endemic silkworm species are also collected in the Madagascar mangroves for wild silk production.
- In the Bahamas, for example, active efforts to save mangroves are occurring on the islands of Bimini and Great Guana Cay.
- In Trinidad and Tobago as well, efforts are underway to protect a mangrove threatened by the construction of a steel mill and a port.
- Within northern Ecuador, mangrove regrowth is reported in almost all estuaries and stems primarily from local actors responding to earlier periods of deforestation in the Esmeraldas region.

Mangroves have been reported to be able to help buffer against tsunami, cyclones, and other storms, and as such may be considered a flagship system for ecosystem-based adaptation to the impacts of climate change. One village in Tamil Nadu was protected from tsunami destruction—the villagers in Naluvedapathy planted 80,244 saplings to get into the Guinness Book of World Records. This created a kilometre-wide belt of trees of various varieties. When the 2004 tsunami struck, much of the land around the village was flooded, but the village suffered minimal damage.

=== Biogeochemical implications of conservation ===
Mangroves sequester over 25 million tons of carbon annually. Mangrove areas have declined globally over recent decades due to the expansion of aquaculture, and oil and timber production. Mangrove loss has been associated with reduced carbon storage and altered carbon export dynamics. Regions including the Niger Delta, Gazi Bay, and parts of South and Southeast Asia have experienced increased vulnerability due to both mangrove loss and increased atmospheric CO_{2}. In response, conservation strategies have been implemented to support mangrove protection and ecosystem stability. Some nations have yet to develop marine protected areas

- Niger Delta, Nigeria: In Nigeria, poorly regulated oil and agricultural exploitation are the leading causes of mangrove degradation. Centre for Environment and Human Rights Development (CEHRD) has launched several projects to train locals in mangrove restoration and conservation.
- Gazi Bay, Kenya: In 2010, residents of Gazi Bay partnered Plan Vivo and Association for Coastal Ecosystem Services (ACES) to implement a mangrove conservation and restoration project. The project generates income for local communities through carbon credits based on emission reductions.
- Trapeang Sangkae, Cambodia: A recent study reports the Trapeang Sangkae community (TFC) implemented a Community-Based Natural Resource Management (CBNRM) project in 2005. The project has the primary goal of conserving and protecting coastal natural resources and biodiversity.

=== Ocean deoxygenation ===
Compared to seagrass meadows and coral reefs, hypoxia is more common on a regular basis in mangrove ecosystems, through ocean deoxygenation is compounding the negative effects by anthropogenic nutrient inputs and land use modification.

Like seagrass, mangrove trees transport oxygen to roots of rhizomes, reduce sulfide concentrations, and alter microbial communities. Dissolved oxygen is more readily consumed in the interior of the mangrove forest. Anthropogenic inputs may push the limits of survival in many mangrove microhabitats. For example, shrimp ponds constructed in mangrove forests are considered the greatest anthropogenic threat to mangrove ecosystems. These shrimp ponds reduce estuary circulation and water quality which leads to the promotion of diel-cycling hypoxia. When the quality of the water degrades, the shrimp ponds are quickly abandoned leaving massive amounts of wastewater. This is a major source of water pollution that promotes ocean deoxygenation in the adjacent habitats.

Due to these frequent hypoxic conditions, the water does not provide habitats to fish. When exposed to extreme hypoxia, ecosystem function can completely collapse. Extreme deoxygenation will affect the local fish populations, which are an essential food source. The environmental costs of shrimp farms in the mangrove forests grossly outweigh the economic benefits of them. Cessation of shrimp production and restoration of these areas reduce eutrophication and anthropogenic hypoxia.

== Reforestation ==
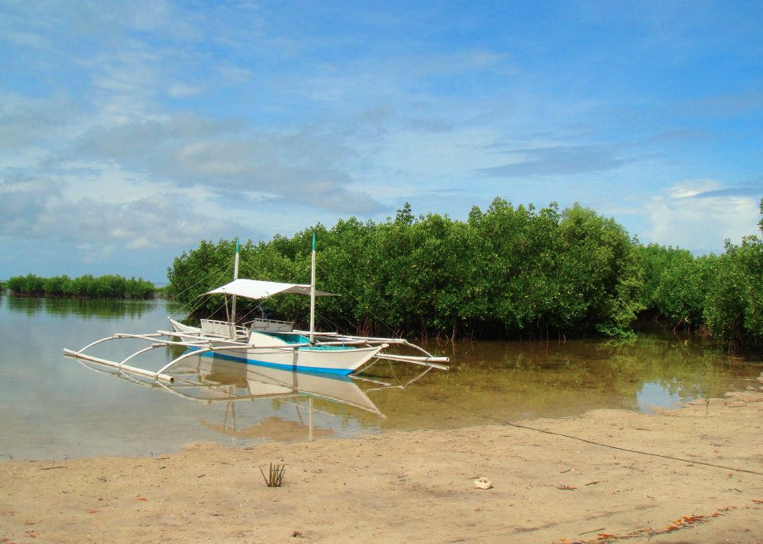
Mangroves in Bohol, Philippines

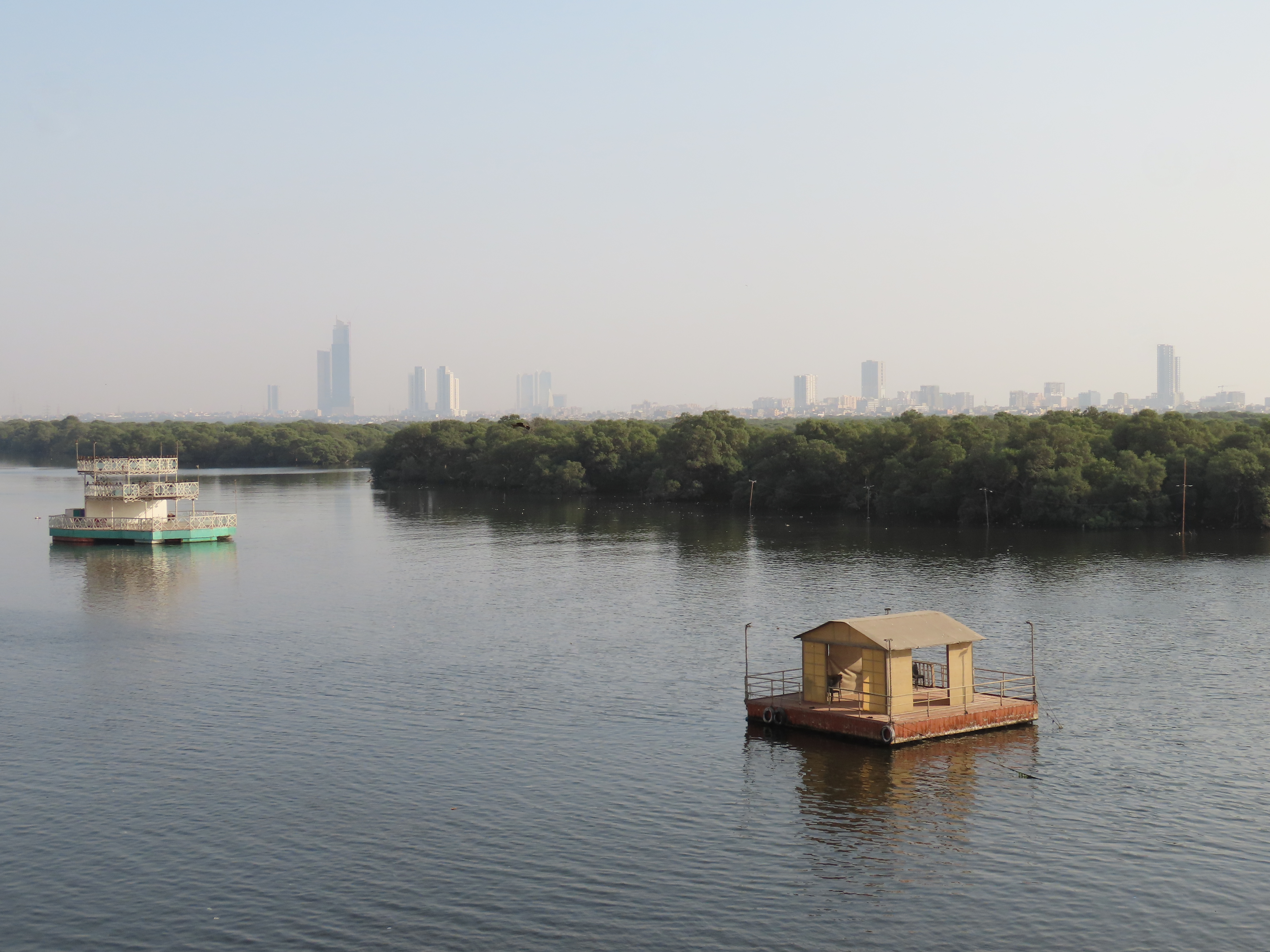
Mangroves in Karachi, Pakistan

In some areas, mangrove reforestation and mangrove restoration is also underway. Red mangroves are the most common choice for cultivation, used particularly in marine aquariums in a sump to reduce nitrates and other nutrients in the water. Mangroves also appear in home aquariums, and as ornamental plants, such as in Japan.

External videos
- Restoring The Natural Mangrove Forest – Mangrove Action Project

The Manzanar Mangrove Initiative is an ongoing experiment in Arkiko, Eritrea, part of the Manzanar Project founded by Gordon H. Sato, establishing new mangrove plantations on the coastal mudflats. Initial plantings failed, but observation of the areas where mangroves did survive by themselves led to the conclusion that nutrients in water flow from inland were important to the health of the mangroves. Trials with the Eritrean Ministry of Fisheries followed, and a planting system was designed to provide the nitrogen, phosphorus, and iron missing from seawater.

The propagules are planted inside a reused galvanized steel can with the bottom knocked out; a small piece of iron and a pierced plastic bag with fertilizer containing nitrogen and phosphorus are buried with the propagule. As of 2007, after six years of planting, 700,000 mangroves are growing; providing stock feed for sheep and habitat for oysters, crabs, other bivalves, and fish.

Another method of restoring mangroves is by using quadcopters (which are able to carry and deposit seed pods). According to Irina Fedorenko, an amount of work equivalent to weeks of planting using traditional methods can be done by a drone in days, and at a fraction of the cost.

Seventy percent of mangrove forests have been lost in Java, Indonesia. Mangroves formerly protected the island's coastal land from flooding and erosion. Wetlands International, an NGC based in the Netherlands, in collaboration with nine villages in Demak where lands and homes had been flooded, began reviving mangrove forests in Java. Wetlands International introduced the idea of developing tropical versions of techniques traditionally used by the Dutch to catch sediment in North Sea coastal salt marshes. Originally, the villagers constructed a sea barrier by hammering two rows of vertical bamboo poles into the seabed and filling the gaps with brushwood held in place with netting. Later the bamboo was replaced by PVC pipes filled with concrete. As sediment gets deposited around the brushwood, it serves to catch floating mangrove seeds and provide them with a stable base to germinate, take root and regrow. This creates a green belt of protection around the islands. As the mangroves mature, more sediment is held in the catchment area; the process is repeated until a mangrove forest has been restored. Eventually the protective structures will not be needed. By late 2018, 16 km (9.9 mi) of brushwood barriers along the coastline had been completed.

A concern over reforestation is that although it supports increases in mangrove area it may actually result in a decrease in global mangrove functionality and poor restoration processes may result in longer term depletion of the mangrove resource.

== National and international studies ==
In terms of local and national studies of mangrove loss, the case of Belize's mangroves is illustrative in its contrast to the global picture. A recent, satellite-based study—funded by the World Wildlife Fund and conducted by the Water Center for the Humid Tropics of Latin America and the Caribbean (CATHALAC)—indicates Belize's mangrove cover declined by a mere 2% over a 30-year period. The study was born out of the need to verify the popular conception that mangrove clearing in Belize was rampant.

Instead, the assessment showed, between 1980 and 2010, under 16 km^{2} (6.2 mi^{2}) of mangroves had been cleared, although clearing of mangroves near Belize's main coastal settlements (e.g. Belize City and San Pedro) was relatively high. The rate of loss of Belize's mangroves—at 0.07% per year between 1980 and 2010—was much lower than Belize's overall rate of forest clearing (0.6% per year in the same period). These findings can also be interpreted to indicate Belize's mangrove regulations (under the nation's) have largely been effective. Nevertheless, the need to protect Belize's mangroves is imperative, as a 2009 study by the World Resources Institute (WRI) indicates the ecosystems contribute US$174 to US$249 million per year to Belize's national economy.

From 1990, in Tanzania, Adelaida K. Semesi led aresearch programme which resulted in Tanzania being one of the first countries to have an environmental management plan for mangroves. Nicknamed "mama mikoko" ("mama mangroves" in Swahili), Semesi also was a Council Member for the International Society for Mangrove Ecosystems.

External videos
- NASA and Mangroves – YouTube

In May 2019, ORNL DAAC News announced that NASA's Carbon Monitoring System (CMS), using new satellite-based maps of global mangrove forests across 116 countries, had created a new dataset to characterize the "distribution, biomass, and canopy height of mangrove-forested wetlands". Mangrove forests move carbon dioxide "from the atmosphere into long-term storage" in greater quantities than other forests, making them "among the planet's best carbon scrubbers" according to a NASA-led study.

== See also ==
- Ecological values of mangroves
- Mangrove restoration
- Mangrove tree distribution
- Freshwater swamp forest
