= Naluvedapathy =

- village
- Location in Tamil Nadu, India Naluvedapathy (India)
- Coordinates: 10.5032561°N 79.8422813°E
- Country: India
- State: Tamil Nadu

Languages
  - Official: Tamil
- Time zone: UTC+5:30 (IST)

Naluvedapathy is a coastal village in the Indian state of Tamil Nadu. It is located in the Vedaranyam taluk of the Nagapattinam district. It sits on the mouth of the Addapar River. Based on the 2001 census in India and numerous village and tsunami censuses after the 2004 Indian Ocean tsunami, it has a population of approximately 4500 people, most of whom lower middle class and intermediate caste. The village's primary businesses, like other villages on the coast of Tamil Nadu, are farming and fishing. The entire Nagapattinam district was severely affected by the Indian Ocean tsunamis, however, Naluvedapathy emerged virtually unscathed. This was due to the presence of a very large windbreak planted by inhabitants of the region in 2002.

== History ==
On 4 December 2002, 300 farmers planted 80,244 Casuarina saplings in 24 hours, achieving a new Guinness World Record in the process forming what has been called "The Guinness Garden". This Guinness Record plantation was organised by Nagapattinam District Administration led by District Collector Sudeep Jain and Sub Collector S J Chiru. According to Sudeep Jain, "We planted trees for invoking rain gods as this area had faced drought for several years". The saplings were spread over 20 hectares next to the coast. On 26 December 2004, tsunamis battered the coast of Tamil Nadu after an earthquake in Sumatra: the 2004 Indian Ocean earthquake and tsunami. However, out of 8,000 fatalities in the state, only one was from Naluvedapathy and most of the village remained unscathed. The trees, which were known to be strong wind barriers, served as barriers against the tsunamis and stopped a large amount of water from reaching the village. It was also noted that there was no loss of life within the fishing community and no psychological trauma amongst the people of the village following the tsunami. Sudeep Jain later mobilised his school alumni and founded a tsunami rehabilitation trust named BITSunami to rehabilitate and develop this village along with neighbouring Pushpavanam village. BITSunami, NCC Cadets led by Col Sunil Anand and District Administration led by then District Collector J Radhakrishnan once again went on a massive tree plantation spree planting 254,464 saplings on 2 Oct 2005 creating a new Guinness World Record.

== Demographics ==
Based on the 2001 census, the total population of Naluvedapathy is 4354 with 2199 males and 2155 females. Out of 1515 households, only three were attributed to forward castes. Most inhabitants of the village inhabitants speak Tamil and the majority of inhabitants in the Nagapattinam district are Hindu in religion.

== Economy ==
The village's primary businesses are in fishing and the farming of tamarind, groundnut, mango, coconut and cashew. The region also has an immense number of Casuarina trees. The farming industry has suffered in past years due to a long drought. Thirty-six percent of households in the region are involved in the fishing industry. The primary area of fishing is in the Bay of Bengal.

The village possesses school buildings and sanitation facilities and is well-connected to roads and electricity. Education is provided for students in the village up to middle school, however students have to travel numerous kilometres for secondary education.

== Transportation ==
As in most Indian villages, the only method of transportation within the village is walking and two wheelers. An extensive bus system exists for travelling outside the village. The village is connected to other parts of Tamil Nadu via road. Its connection to other parts of Tamil Nadu is mainly used for the educational purposes of students, who need to travel 7–10 km to go to a location which has secondary education.
