= Addapar River =

River in Tamil Nadu, India

- Location within Tamil Nadu Location within India

Physical characteristics
- Mouth
  - coordinates: 10.494542°N 79.842904°E

Addapar is a river flowing in the Nagapattinam district of the Indian state of Tamil Nadu.

== See also ==
- List of rivers of Tamil Nadu
