= M. flavescens =

M. flavescens may refer to:

- Macrothemis flavescens, a carnivorous insect
- Magellania flavescens, a marine animal
- Malouetia flavescens, a flowering plant
- Maro flavescens, a sheet weaver
- Marsdenia flavescens, synonym of Leichhardtia flavescens, an eastern Australian vine
- Melese flavescens, an Argentinian moth
- Memecylon flavescens, a plant endemic to India
- Mesolestes flavescens, a ground beetle
- Mesoprion flavescens, a subtropical fish
- Metareva flavescens, an Argentinian moth
- Microbacterium flavescens, a Gram-positive bacterium
- Miltonia flavescens, a South American orchid
- Mitra flavescens, a sea snail
- Monema flavescens, an Asian moth
- Monocerotesa flavescens, a geometer moth
- Mycena flavescens, a fungus with an edible mushroom
- Mycobacterium flavescens, a Gram-positive bacterium
- Mytilaspis flavescens, a scale insect
