= Florida mangroves =

Ecoregion along the coasts of the Florida peninsula, and the Florida Keys

Ecology
- Realm: Neotropical
- Biome: mangroves
- Borders: Everglades; Southeastern conifer forests

Geography
- Country: United States
- States: Florida

Conservation
- Conservation status: Critical/endangered

The Florida mangroves ecoregion, of the mangrove forest biome, comprise an ecosystem along the coasts of the Florida peninsula, and the Florida Keys. Four major species of mangrove populate the region: red mangrove, black mangrove, white mangrove, and the buttonwood. The mangroves live in the coastal zones in the more tropical southern parts of Florida; mangroves are particularly vulnerable to frosts. Mangroves are important habitat as both fish nursery and brackish water habitats for birds and other coastal species.

Though climate change is expected to extend the mangrove range further north, sea level rise, extreme weather and other changes related to climate change may endanger existing mangrove populations. Other threats include development and other human disruption.

== Florida's mangrove species ==
The Florida mangroves ecoregion includes three mangrove species:

Red mangrove tree in Everglades National Park

- Rhizophora mangle — red mangrove

Red mangroves are characterized by a dendritic network of aerial prop roots extending into the soil. This allows them to live in anaerobic conditions by providing gas exchange. They attain 82–125 feet in height in deltas and 26–33 feet along shoreline. The bark is gray on the outside with a red interior. These trees also have small white flowers that are wind pollinated with 10-12 inch long pencil shaped seeds.

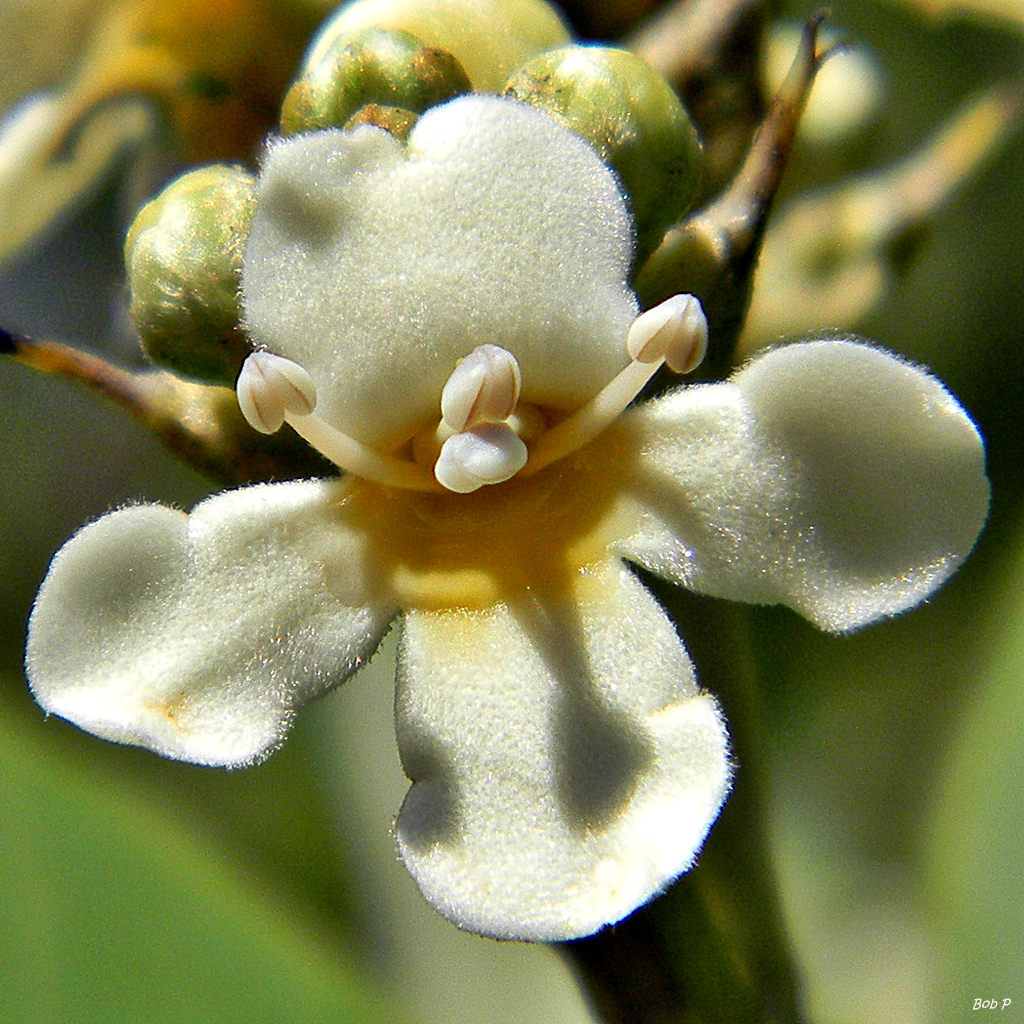
Black mangrove flower

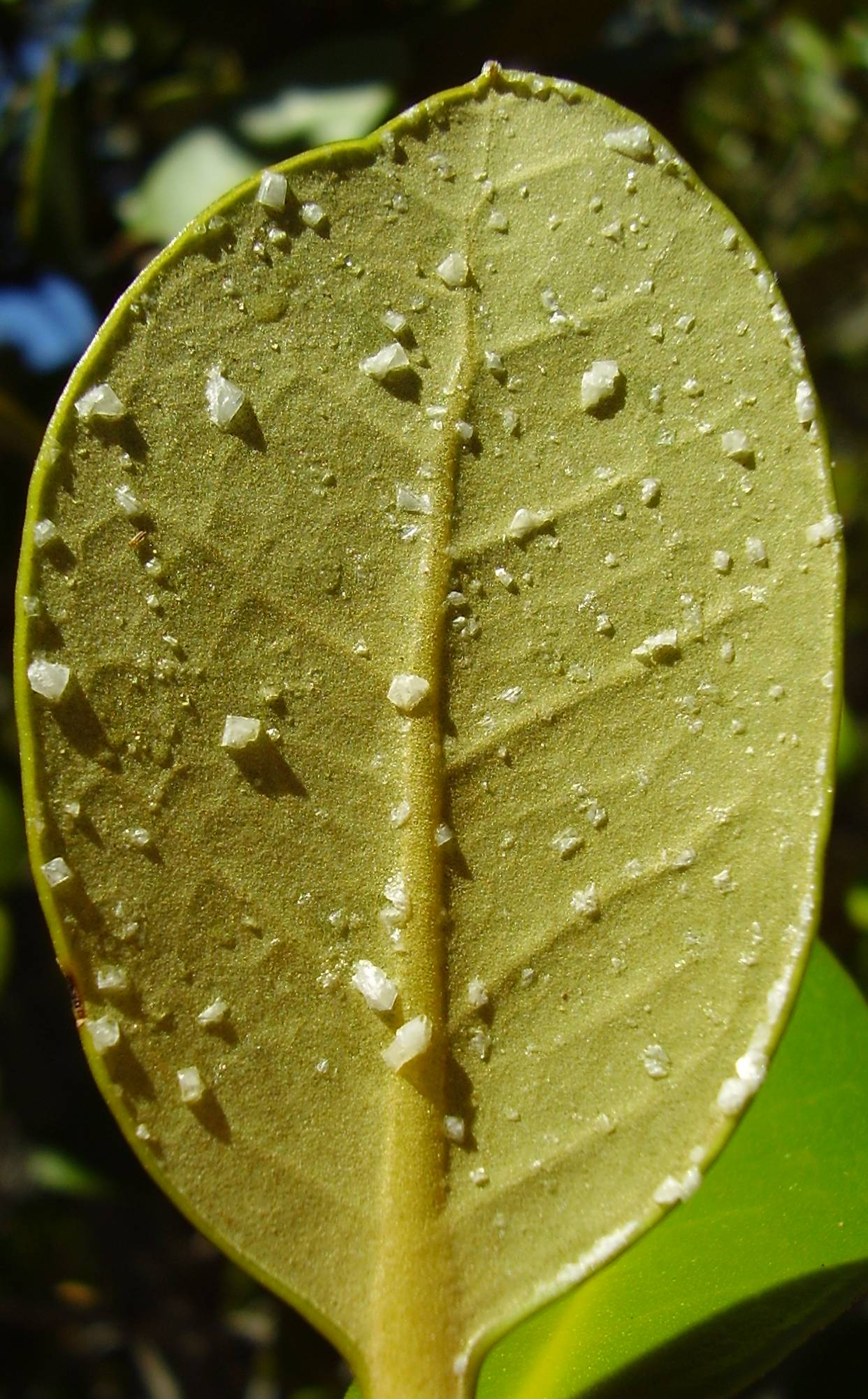
Excreted salt on the underside of a mangrove leaf

- Avicennia germinans — black mangrove

Black mangrove trees grow to a heights of 133 feet and average 66 feet. They are characterized by vertically erect aerating branches (pneumatophores) extending up to 20 cm above the soil. The bark is dark and scaly and the upper surface of the leaves is often covered with salt excreted by the plant. This tree has white flowers that are bilaterally symmetrical and pollinated by Hymenoptera; they are the source of mangrove honey. The seed is shaped and sized similar to a lima bean when germinated. Younger black mangrove trees are shade intolerant but become more shade tolerant as they mature.

- Laguncularia racemosa — white mangrove

White mangrove trees grow to 45 feet in height and up and tend to have a more erect form than the other species. They have erect, blunt-tipped pneumatophores that are used if they are growing in anaerobic conditions. The bark is white, relatively smooth and the leaves are oval shaped and flattened. Small yellowish flowers are located on the terminal ends of the branches. These may germinate into football shaped propagules. However this may not occur if they are in the northern part of their range.

- Conocarpus erectus — buttonwood (one species that is variously classified as a mangrove or a mangrove associate) Buttonwoods grow 39 to 46 feet tall but do not produce a true propagule.

Tiny brownish flowers are located at the terminal ends of the branches forming a seed cluster known as the button. These trees are able to grow in areas seldom inundated by tidal water. Two glands are located at the apex of the petiole (leaf stalk) and excrete excess salts and extrafloral nectar.

== Zonation ==
All three mangrove species flower in the spring and early summer. Propagules fall from late summer through early autumn. These plants have differing adaptions to conditions along coasts, and are generally found in partially overlapping bands or zones, roughly parallel to the shoreline. The red mangrove grows closest to open water. It has multiple prop roots, which may help to stabilize the soil around its roots. Further inland is the black mangrove lacking prop roots, but does have pneumatophores, which grow up from the roots to above the water level. The white mangrove grows further inland. It may have prop roots and/or pneumatophores, depending on conditions where it is growing. The buttonwood grows in shallow, brackish water, Florida swamps, or on dry land (the furthest inland).

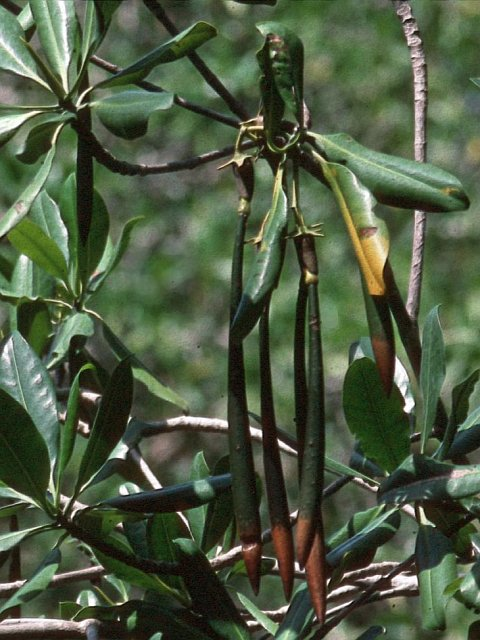
Attached propagules of the viviparous mangrove tree Rhizophora mangle, Bragança, en:Pará, North Brazil

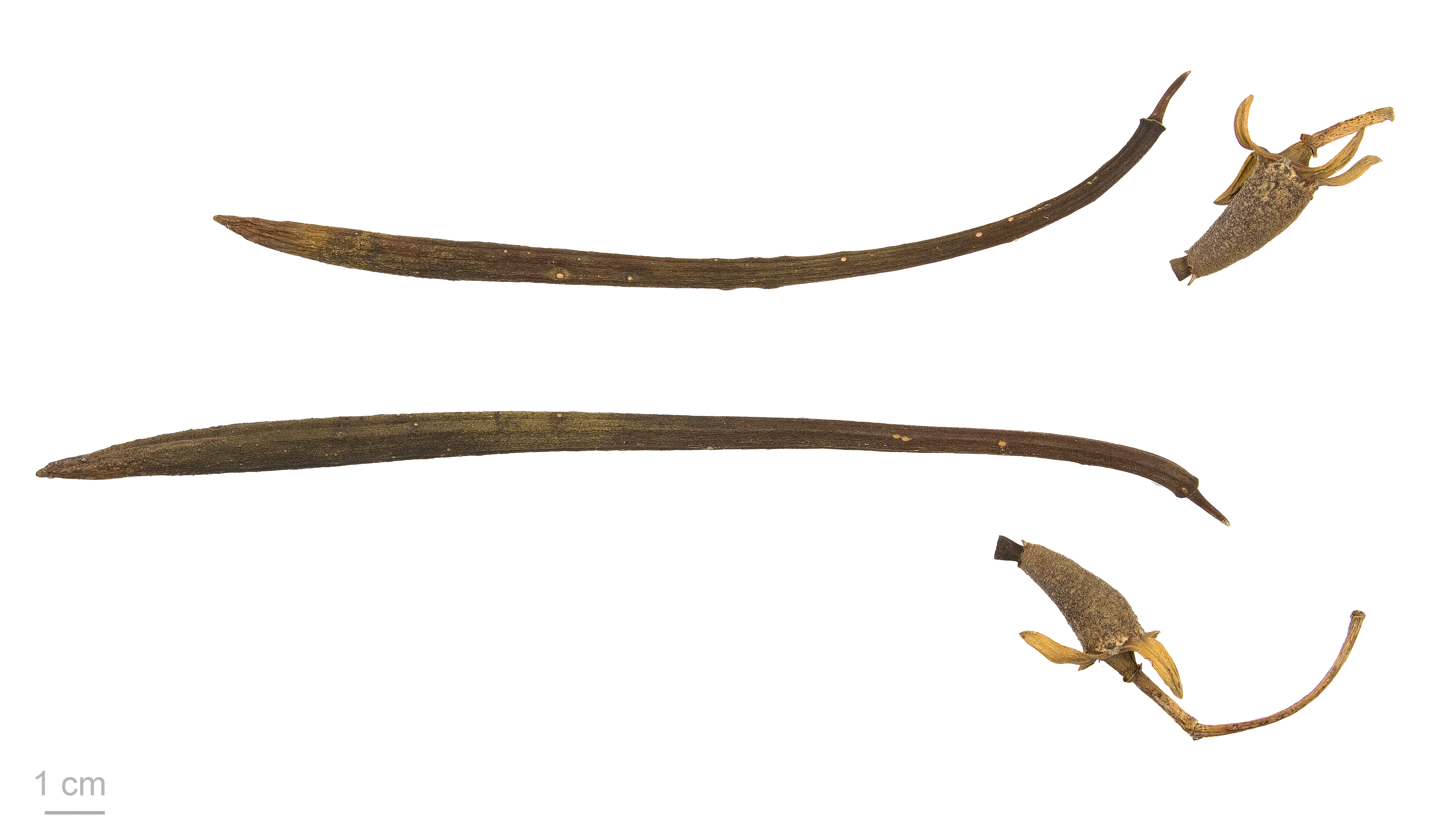
Red mangrove tree fruits and propagules

== Reproductive strategy ==
Mangroves have a unique reproductive strategy for a plant. Like mammals they are viviparious, bringing forth live young. Instead of dormant seeds, they produce propagules that begin embryonic development while still attached to the tree and only release at the appropriate time into water. Once released from the tree they require various dispersal times or "obligate dispersal periods" (5–40 days depending upon the species) where the embryonic development continues. Once a favorable site is found there is an "obligate stranding period" before a tree emerges and begins to grow.

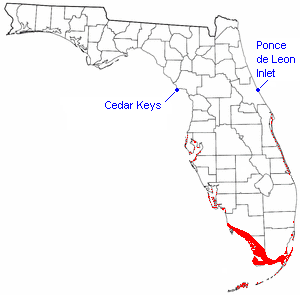
The distribution of the mangrove community in Florida is shown in red. Cedar Keys and Ponce de Leon Inlet are the northern limits of the mangrove community.

== Distribution ==
Florida mangrove plant communities covered an estimated 430,000 to 540,000 acres (1,700 to 2,200 km^{2}) in Florida in 1981. Ninety percent of the Florida mangroves are in southern Florida, in Collier, Lee, Miami-Dade and Monroe Counties.

Approximately 280,000 acres (1,100 km^{2}) of mangrove forests are in the hands of the Federal, State and local governments, and of private, non-profit organizations. Most of those acres are in Everglades National Park. Mangroves cover a wide band all along the southern end of the Florida peninsula facing on Florida Bay, from Key Largo across to close to Flamingo, then inland behind the beaches and marl prairies of Cape Sable and all around Whitewater Bay. From Whitewater Bay, a broad band of mangroves extends up the Gulf coast to Marco Island, including the Ten Thousand Islands.

Mangroves also extend throughout the Florida Keys, although coverage has been reduced due to development. Florida Bay is dotted with small islands, which are often no more than mud flats or shoals more or less covered by mangroves. Biscayne Bay also has extensive mangroves, but the northern part of the Bay has been largely cleared of mangroves to make way for urban development. Mangrove coverage is limited elsewhere, with the largest areas in the Indian River Lagoon on the east coast, and the Caloosahatchee River, Pine Island Sound and Charlotte Harbor estuaries and Tampa Bay on the west coast.

=== Preferred climate ===
Mangroves are tropical plants, killed by freezing temperatures. These trees can range about halfway up the coast of the Florida peninsula due to mild winter climate and the moderating effect of the warm waters of the Gulf of Mexico on the west coast and the Gulf Stream and Atlantic Ocean on the east coast. The Florida mangrove community is found as far north as Cedar Key on the Gulf coast of Florida, and as far north as the Ponce de Leon Inlet on the Atlantic coast of Florida. Black mangroves can regrow from roots after being killed back by a freeze, and are found by themselves a little further north, to Jacksonville on the east coast and along the Florida Panhandle on the Gulf coast. Most of Florida is sub-tropical, making it not ideal for mangroves, so the trees tend to be shorter and the leaves smaller in northern and central Florida than in tropical regions. In deep south Florida and the Florida Keys, the tropical climate allows mangroves to grow larger due to being frost free.

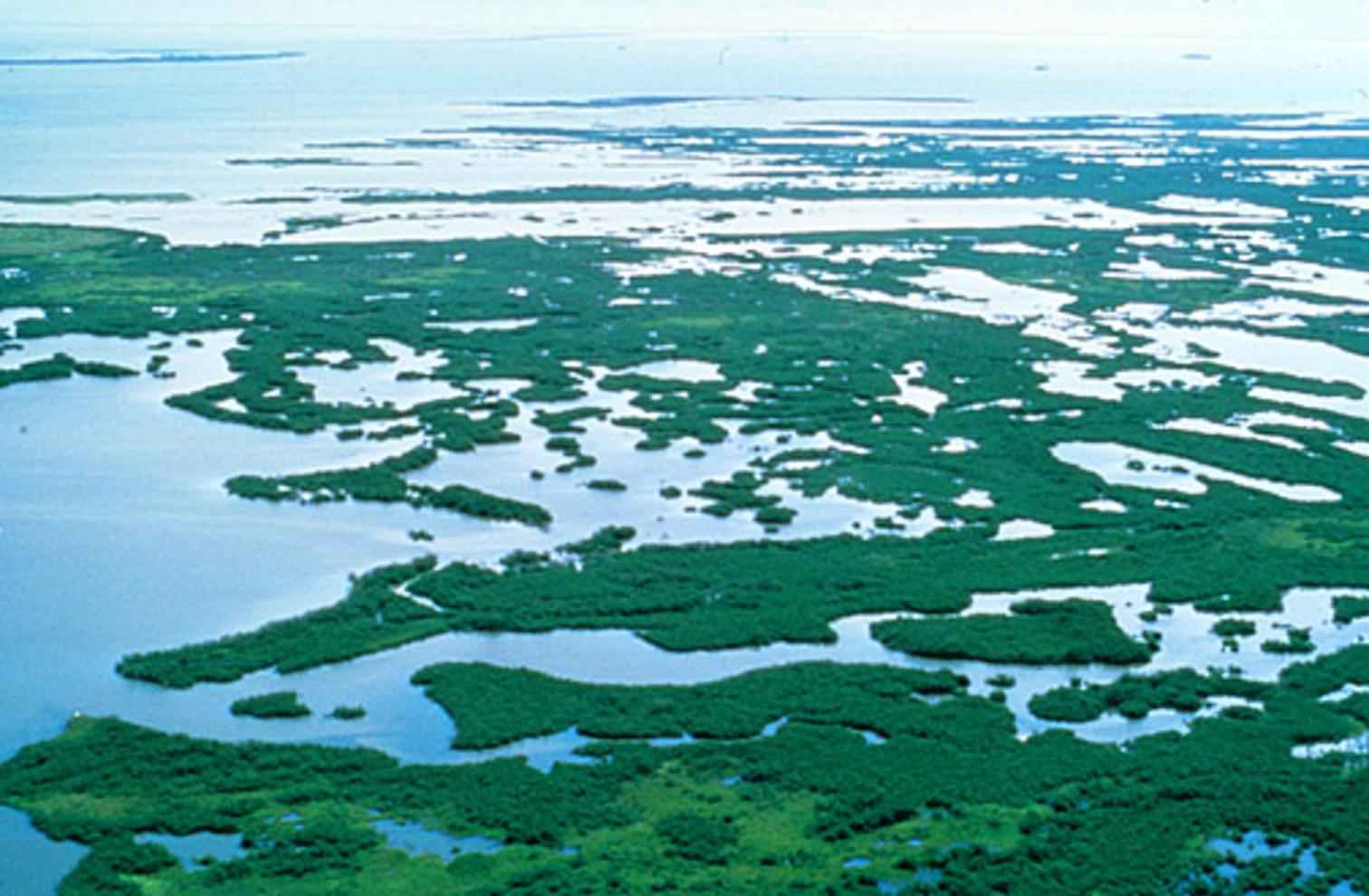
Florida mangroves in the coastal Florida swamps.

=== Habitat destruction ===
Human activity has impacted the mangrove ecoregion in Florida. While the coverage of mangroves at the end of the 20th century is estimated to have decreased only 5% from a century earlier, some localities have seen severe reductions. The Lake Worth Lagoon lost 87% of its mangroves in the second half of the 20th century, leaving a remnant of just 276 acres (1.12 km^{2}). Tampa Bay, home to the busy Port of Tampa, lost over 44% of its wetlands, including mangroves and salt marshes, during the 20th century. Three-quarters of the wetlands along the Indian River Lagoon, including mangroves, were impounded for mosquito control during the 20th century. As of 2001, natural water flow was being restored to some of the wetlands.

== Associated fauna and flora ==
=== Fish ===
The Florida mangrove system is an important habitat for many species. It provides nursery grounds for young fish, crustaceans and mollusks, and for sport and commercial purposes. Many fish feed in the mangrove forests, including snook (Centropomus undecimalis), gray or mangrove snapper (Lutjanus griseus), schoolmaster snapper (Lutjanus apodus), tarpon, jack, sheepshead, red drum, hardhead silverside (Atherinomorus stipes), juvenile blue angelfish (Holocanthus bermudensis), juvenile porkfish (Anisotremus virginicus), lined seahorse (Hippocampus erectus), great barracuda (Sphryaena barracuda), scrawled cowfish (Lactophrys quadricornis) and permit (Trachinotus falcatus), as well as shrimp and clams. An estimated 75% of the game fish and 90% of the commercial fish species in south Florida depend on the mangrove system.

=== Birds ===
The branches of mangroves serve as roosts and rookeries for coastal and wading birds, such as the brown pelican (Oelicanus occidentalis), roseate spoonbill (Ajajia ajaia), frigatebird (Fregata magnificans), double-crested cormorant (Phalacrocorax carbo), belted kingfisher (Megaceryle alcyon), brown noddy (Anous stolidus), great white heron and Wurdemann's heron, color phases of the great blue heron (Adrea herodias), osprey (Pandion haliaetus), snowy egret (Egretta thula), green heron (Butorides striatus), reddish egret (Dichromanassa rufescens) and greater yellowlegs (Tringa melanoleuca).

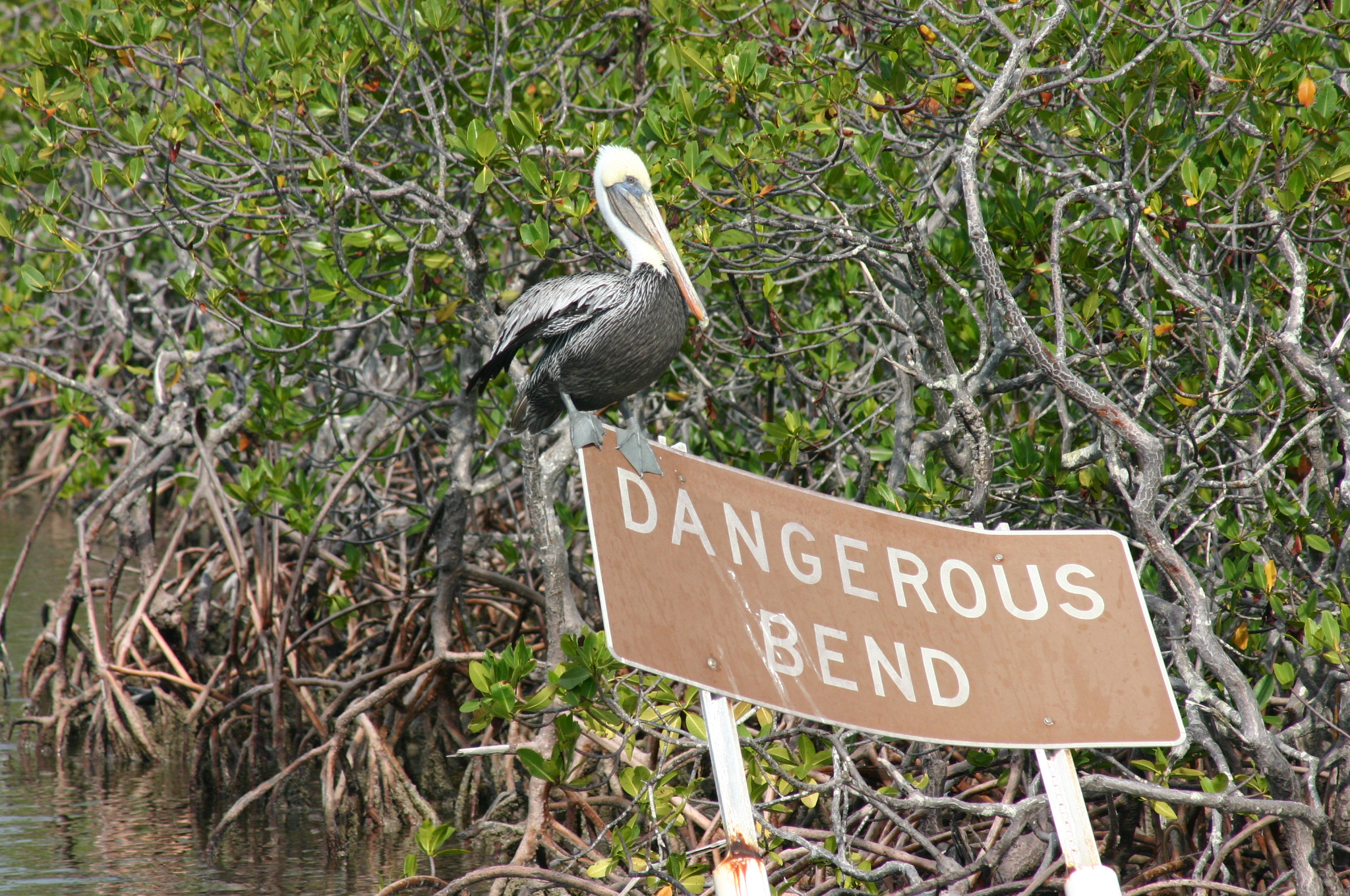
Brown pelican

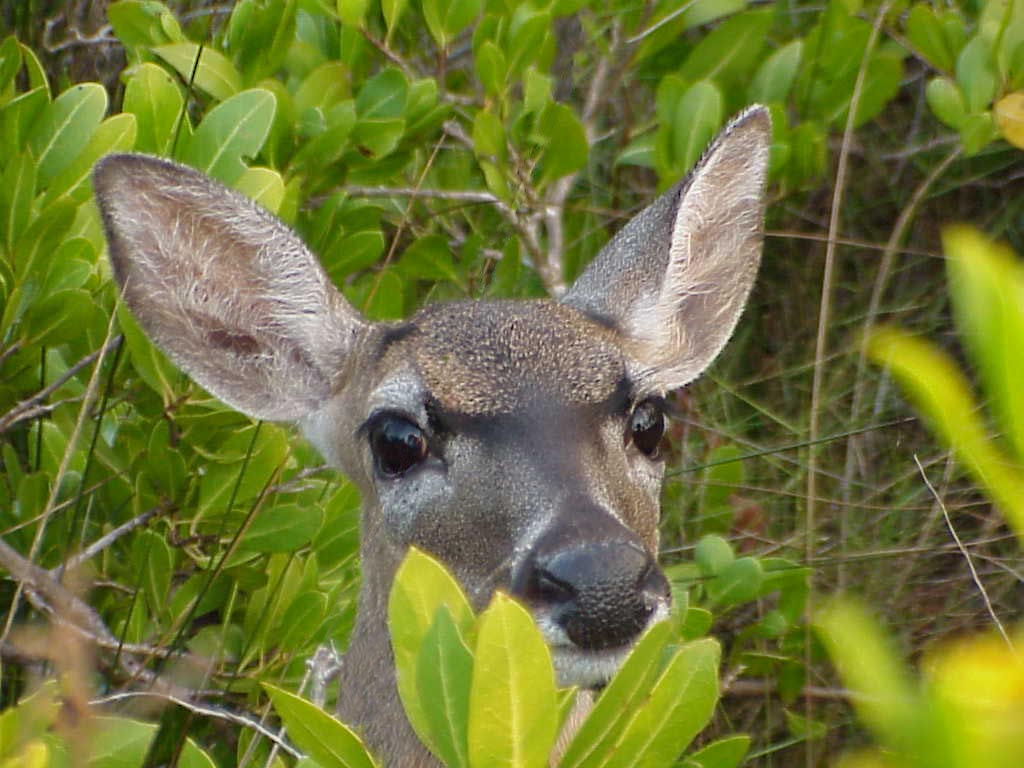
Key deer (Odocoileus viginianus clavium)

=== Endangered species ===
Florida mangroves are also home to the following endangered species:

- Smalltooth sawfish (Pristis pectinata)
- American crocodile (Crocodylus acutus)
- Hawksbill sea turtle (Eretmochelys imbricata)
- Atlantic ridley sea turtle (Lepidochelys kempii)
- Eastern indigo snake (Drymarchon corais)
- Atlantic saltmarsh snake (Nerodia clarkii taeniata)
- Southern bald eagle (Haliaeetus leucocephalus leucocephalus)
- Peregrine falcon (Falco columbarius)
- Barbados yellow warbler (Dendroica petechia petechia)
- Key deer (Odocoileus virginianus clavium)
- West Indian manatee (Trichechus manatus)

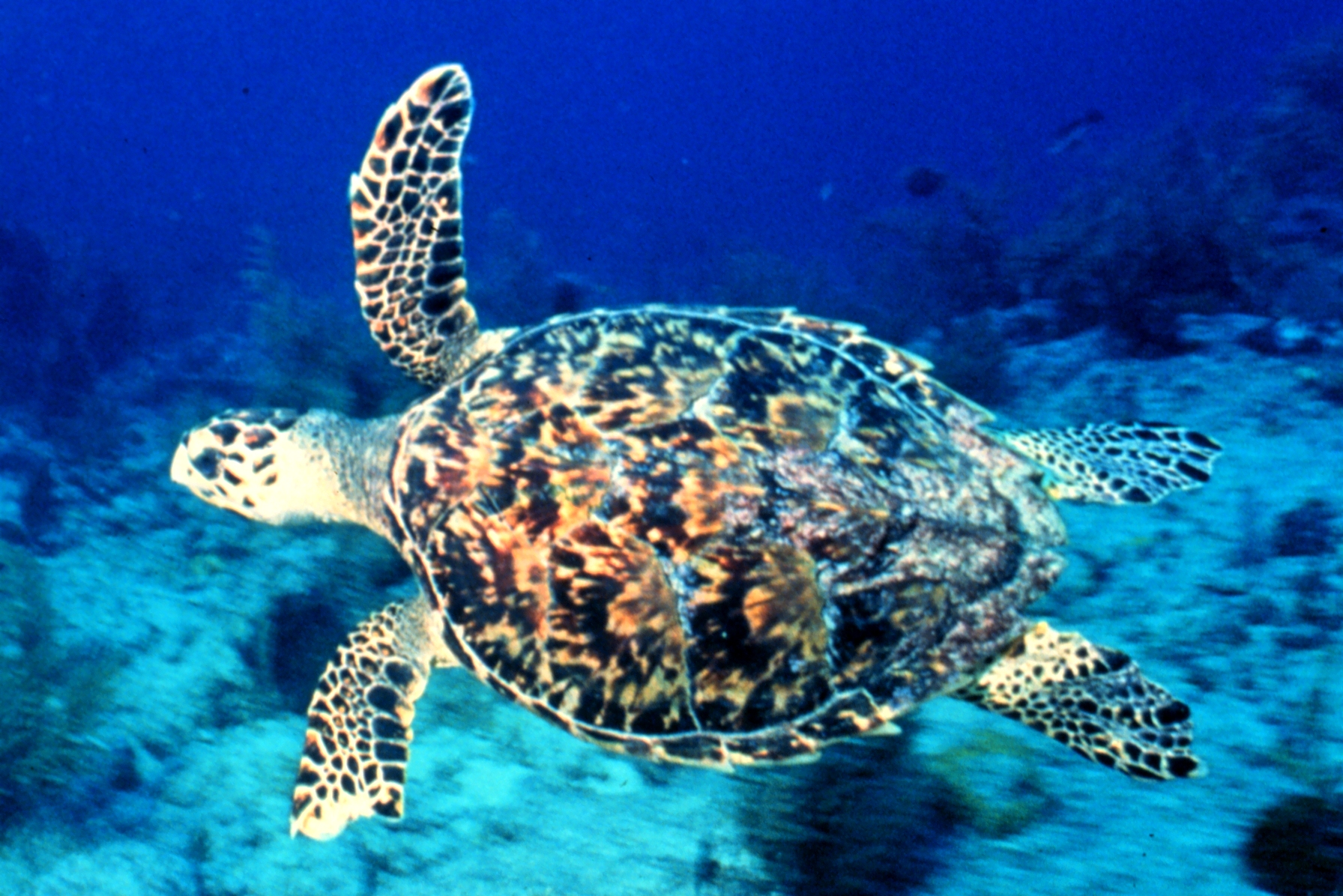
Hawksbill turtle (Eretmochelys imbricata)

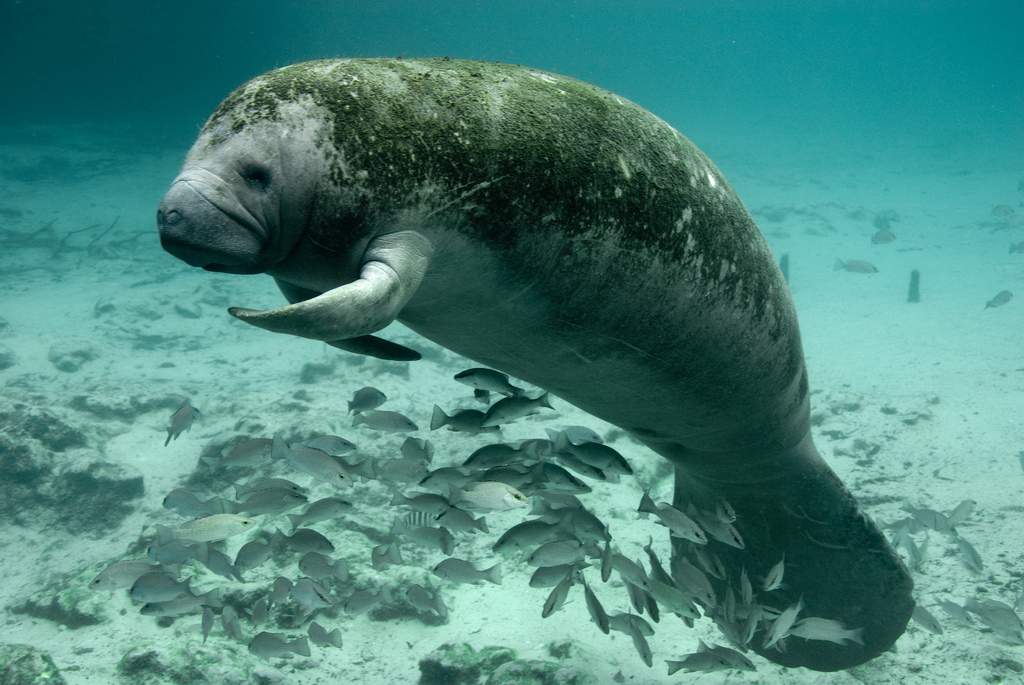
Endangered Florida manatee (Trichechus manatus)

=== Other fauna ===
Above the water mangroves also shelter and support snails, crabs, and spiders. Below the water's surface, often encrusted on the mangrove roots, are sponges, anemones, corals, oysters, tunicates, mussels, starfish, crabs, and Florida spiny lobsters (Panulirus argus).

=== Flora ===
The mangrove branches and trunks support various epiphytes(?). Below the water, spaces protected by splayed mangrove roots can shelter seagrasses.

== Effects of climate change ==
Climate change is a complex issue with numerous variables. The exact severity (such as how much global temperatures will increase) is impossible to predict. The effects of climate change on a species are even more difficult to discern. Despite the intricacy, scientists have formulated several hypotheses of the effects of climate change on the mangroves of southern Florida. The overall hypothesis is that mangroves are vulnerable to climate change, which will affect this ecosystem via three main mechanisms: sea level rise, decreased cold weather events, and increased storm severity. A rise in sea level is expected to affect the range of mangroves, the decrease in cold weather events will allow the range of mangroves to shift further north, and the increase in the severity of storms is anticipated to change the species composition and morphology of the mangroves.

=== Sea level rise ===
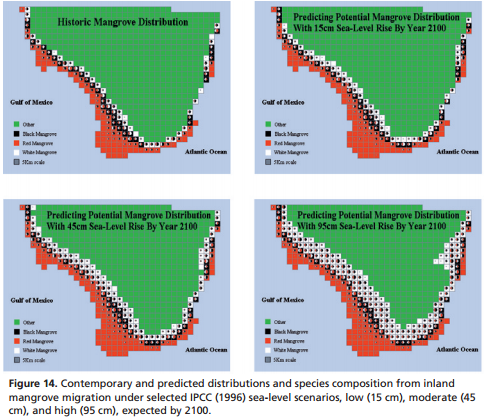
Estimated effects of sea level rise on the species composition and distribution of Florida's mangroves by 2100 under low, moderate, and severe scenarios.

Between 1870 and 2004, the current sea level rise has been approximately 8 inches total, or 1.46 mm/yr. and studies show that mangroves in southern Florida expanded their territories 3.3 km inland since the 1940s. However, this expansion inland is often at the expense of freshwater marsh/swamp habitats. As climate change continues, this could potentially negatively affect wildlife resources that depend upon freshwater habitats over mangrove habitats, such as the Everglades. The figure at the right shows projections of mangrove distributions under low (15 cm), moderate (45 cm), and severe (95 cm) sea rise scenarios by the year 2100. The IPCC Fifth Assessment Report which was finalized in 2014 is now predicting 52–98 cm sea level rise by 2100. In addition, this report has often been criticized as underestimating the severity of climate change making it even more likely for the moderate (45 cm) or severe (95 cm) sea rise scenarios to occur. Despite the fact mangroves are currently keeping pace with sea level rise, at rates greater than 2.3mm/yr there is potential for mangrove ecosystem failure. This failure is perhaps inevitable for mangroves inhabiting low-lying islands which will be inundated. Sea level rise is expected to accelerate in the future and there is some indication already of this beginning to occur. However, there are examples from the past in which mangroves have both collapsed and survived at rates greater than 2.3mm/yr. Mangroves that are on continental coasts instead of low-lying islands experience reduced vulnerability and have greater opportunities to occupy new habitat.

=== Temperature shifts ===
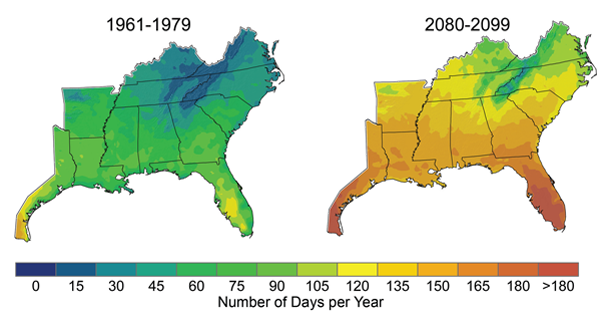
The number of days per year with peak temperature over 90°F is expected to rise significantly, especially under a higher emissions scenario4 as shown in the map above. By the end of the century, projections indicate that North Florida will have more than 165 days (nearly six months) per year over 90°F, up from roughly 60 days in the 1960s and 1970s. The increase in very hot days will have consequences for human health, drought, and wildfires.

Southern Florida's mangroves are a tropical species that are limited to the tip of the Florida peninsula and the Florida Keys due to a climate preference. The upper portion of Florida falls into a sub-tropical climate hindering mangrove growth there due to cold weather events such as freezing. Twenty-eight years of satellite imagery has shown that mangroves have shifted their range northward in Florida in response to less harsh winters and less frequent cold events. This is an issue apart from sea level rise which will cause mangroves to move inland even though both are caused by climate change.

=== Increased storm severity ===
With climate change hurricanes in southern Florida are projected to become more severe causing mangrove populations to be shorter, of smaller diameter, and contain a higher proportion of red mangrove species. Mangroves could be further threatened by storms if the return time of major storms exceeds reestablishment. In addition, mangroves have been shown to reduce the flow pressure of water surges associated with tsunamis, hurricanes, etc. and by doing so protect coastlines. The loss of mangroves could therefore be detrimental to coastal communities exposed to increased storm surges.

=== Ways to promote resilience ===
Due to the potential for the acceleration of sea level rise and increased storm severity in the future due to climate change, mangroves of southern Florida may be in jeopardy. This has implications not only for mangrove forests but also the freshwater habitats they encroach upon and the humans and other animals that depend upon both these ecosystem resources and protection. While there is little local managers can do to prevent large scale changes such as sea rise and increased storm severity, according to the International Union for Conservation of Nature and The Nature Conservancy there are ten strategies land managers can do to increase viability and promote resilience.

These are:

- Apply risk-spreading strategies to address the uncertainties of climate change. (A range of mangrove habitats should be protected to capture different community types to ensure replenishment following disasters.)
- Identify and protect critical areas that are naturally positioned to survive climate change.
- Manage human stresses on mangroves (such as waste, sediment, and nutrient runoff from urban areas and human development).
- Establish greenbelts and buffer zones to allow for mangrove migration in response to sea-level rise, and to reduce impacts from adjacent land-use practices.
- Restore degraded areas that have demonstrated resistance or resilience to climate change.
- Understand and preserve connectivity between mangroves and sources of freshwater and sediment, and between mangroves and their associated habitats like coral reefs and seagrasses (mangroves provide services to coral reef and seagrass systems so coupling them and preserving them together helps the other ecosystem succeed).
- Establish baseline data and monitor the response of mangroves to climate change.
- Implement adaptive strategies to compensate for changes in species ranges and environmental conditions (have flexible management plans).
- Develop alternative livelihoods for mangrove dependent communities as a means to reduce mangrove destruction (charcoal production using coconut shells instead of mangroves, and mangrove honey production).
- Build partnerships with a variety of stakeholders to generate the necessary finances and support to respond to the impacts of climate change.

== See also ==
- Ecological values of mangroves
- List of mangrove ecoregions
- Mangrove tree distribution
- Coastal biogeomorphology
