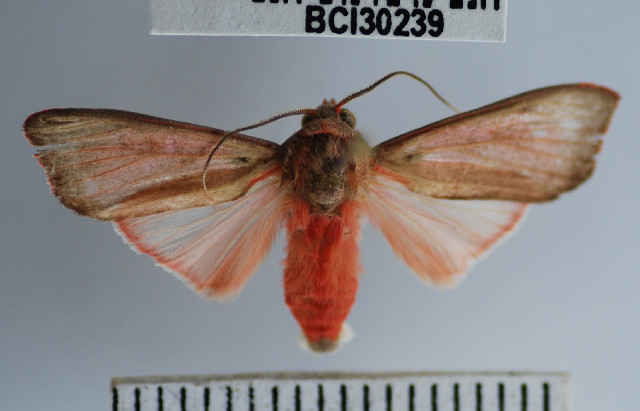

Scientific classification
- Kingdom: Animalia
- Phylum: Arthropoda
- Class: Insecta
- Order: Lepidoptera
- Superfamily: Noctuoidea
- Family: Erebidae
- Subfamily: Arctiinae
- Genus: Melese
- Species: M. incertus

Binomial name
- Melese incertus (Walker, 1855)

Synonyms
- Malabus incertus Walker, 1855; Neritos blanda Druce, 1901; Melese flavipuncta Rothschild, 1909; Melese surdus Rothschild, 1909

= Melese incertus =

Species of moth

Melese incertus is a moth of the family Erebidae. It was described by Francis Walker in 1855. It is found in French Guiana, Suriname, Guyana, Brazil, Venezuela, Trinidad, Peru, Bolivia and Panama.
