= Melese erythrastis =

Scientific classification
- Domain: Eukaryota
- Kingdom: Animalia
- Phylum: Arthropoda
- Class: Insecta
- Order: Lepidoptera
- Superfamily: Noctuoidea
- Family: Erebidae
- Subfamily: Arctiinae
- Genus: Melese
- Species: M. erythrastis

Binomial name
- Melese erythrastis Dognin, 1907

Species of moth

Melese erythrastis is a moth of the family Erebidae. It was described by Paul Dognin in 1907. It is found in French Guiana, Suriname and Guyana.
