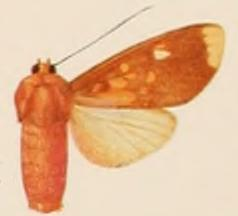
- Male
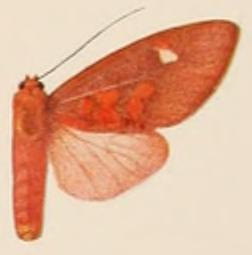
- Female

Scientific classification
- Domain: Eukaryota
- Kingdom: Animalia
- Phylum: Arthropoda
- Class: Insecta
- Order: Lepidoptera
- Superfamily: Noctuoidea
- Family: Erebidae
- Subfamily: Arctiinae
- Genus: Melese
- Species: M. drucei

Binomial name
- Melese drucei Rothschild, 1909

= Melese drucei =

Species of moth

Melese drucei is a moth of the family Erebidae first described by Walter Rothschild in 1909. It is found in Suriname, Peru, Brazil, Guyana. and French Guiana.

The forewing is 17 mm (0.67 in) long in males and 21 mm (0.83 in) long in females.
