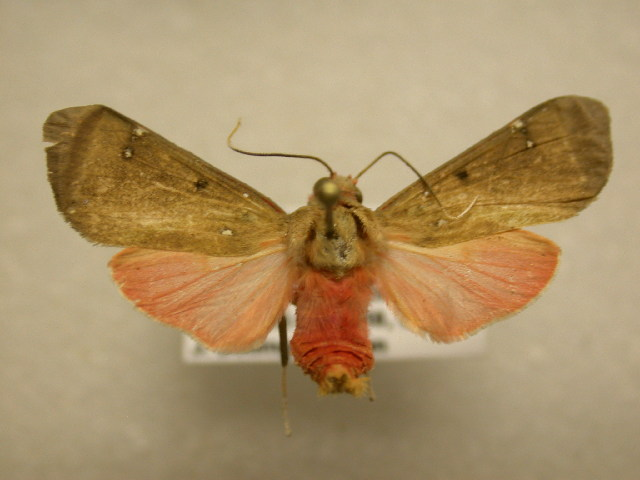

Scientific classification
- Domain: Eukaryota
- Kingdom: Animalia
- Phylum: Arthropoda
- Class: Insecta
- Order: Lepidoptera
- Superfamily: Noctuoidea
- Family: Erebidae
- Subfamily: Arctiinae
- Genus: Melese
- Species: M. asana

Binomial name
- Melese asana (H. Druce, 1884)

Synonyms
- Neritos asana H. Druce, 1884; Melese asana ab. petropolidis Strand, 1919

= Melese asana =

Species of moth

Melese asana is a moth of the family Erebidae. It was described by Herbert Druce in 1884. It is found in Mexico, Panama, Honduras, Colombia and the Amazon region.
