= Melese pumila =

Scientific classification
- Domain: Eukaryota
- Kingdom: Animalia
- Phylum: Arthropoda
- Class: Insecta
- Order: Lepidoptera
- Superfamily: Noctuoidea
- Family: Erebidae
- Subfamily: Arctiinae
- Genus: Melese
- Species: M. pumila

Binomial name
- Melese pumila Dognin, 1908

Species of moth

Melese pumila is a moth of the family Erebidae. It was described by Paul Dognin in 1908. It is found in French Guiana, Suriname, Guyana, Brazil and Venezuela.
