= Melese babosa =

Scientific classification
- Domain: Eukaryota
- Kingdom: Animalia
- Phylum: Arthropoda
- Class: Insecta
- Order: Lepidoptera
- Superfamily: Noctuoidea
- Family: Erebidae
- Subfamily: Arctiinae
- Genus: Melese
- Species: M. babosa

Binomial name
- Melese babosa (Dognin, 1894)

Synonyms
- Neritos babosa Dognin, 1894

Species of moth

Melese babosa is a moth of the family Erebidae. It was described by Paul Dognin in 1894. It is found in Brazil and Ecuador.
