= Melese barbuti =

Scientific classification
- Domain: Eukaryota
- Kingdom: Animalia
- Phylum: Arthropoda
- Class: Insecta
- Order: Lepidoptera
- Superfamily: Noctuoidea
- Family: Erebidae
- Subfamily: Arctiinae
- Genus: Melese
- Species: M. barbuti

Binomial name
- Melese barbuti Vincent, 2004

Species of moth

Melese barbuti is a moth of the family Erebidae. It was described by Vincent in 2004. It is found in Ecuador, Peru and Bolivia.
