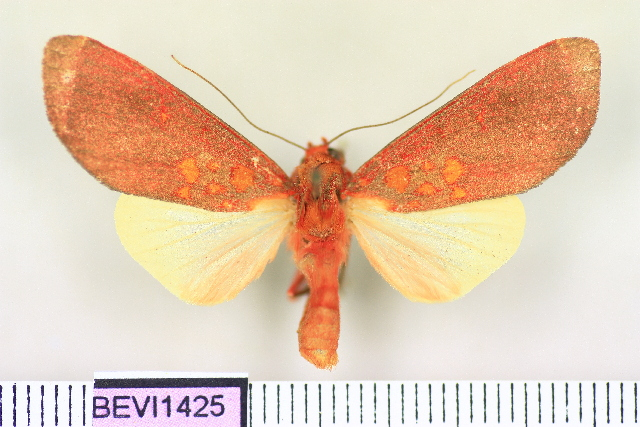

Scientific classification
- Domain: Eukaryota
- Kingdom: Animalia
- Phylum: Arthropoda
- Class: Insecta
- Order: Lepidoptera
- Superfamily: Noctuoidea
- Family: Erebidae
- Subfamily: Arctiinae
- Genus: Melese
- Species: M. levequei

Binomial name
- Melese levequei Vincent, 2004

= Melese levequei =

Species of moth

Melese levequei is a moth of the family Erebidae. It was described by Vincent in 2004. It is found in Venezuela.
