= Melese nebulosa =

Scientific classification
- Domain: Eukaryota
- Kingdom: Animalia
- Phylum: Arthropoda
- Class: Insecta
- Order: Lepidoptera
- Superfamily: Noctuoidea
- Family: Erebidae
- Subfamily: Arctiinae
- Genus: Melese
- Species: M. nebulosa

Binomial name
- Melese nebulosa Joicey & Talbot, 1916

Species of moth

Melese nebulosa is a moth of the family Erebidae. It was described by James John Joicey and George Talbot in 1916. It is found in Peru.
