= Melese chozeba =

Scientific classification
- Domain: Eukaryota
- Kingdom: Animalia
- Phylum: Arthropoda
- Class: Insecta
- Order: Lepidoptera
- Superfamily: Noctuoidea
- Family: Erebidae
- Subfamily: Arctiinae
- Genus: Melese
- Species: M. chozeba

Binomial name
- Melese chozeba (H. Druce, 1884)

Synonyms
- Neritos chozeba H. Druce, 1884

Species of moth

Melese chozeba is a moth of the family Erebidae. It was described by Herbert Druce in 1884. It is found in Costa Rica and possibly Colombia.
