= Melese leucanioides =

Scientific classification
- Domain: Eukaryota
- Kingdom: Animalia
- Phylum: Arthropoda
- Class: Insecta
- Order: Lepidoptera
- Superfamily: Noctuoidea
- Family: Erebidae
- Subfamily: Arctiinae
- Genus: Melese
- Species: M. leucanioides

Binomial name
- Melese leucanioides (Herrich-Schäffer, [1856])

Synonyms
- Idioctetus leucanioides Herrich-Schäffer, [1856]; Melese leucanioides f. silvicola Seitz, 1921

Species of moth

Melese leucanioides is a moth of the family Erebidae. It was described by Gottlieb August Wilhelm Herrich-Schäffer in 1856. It is found in Colombia.
