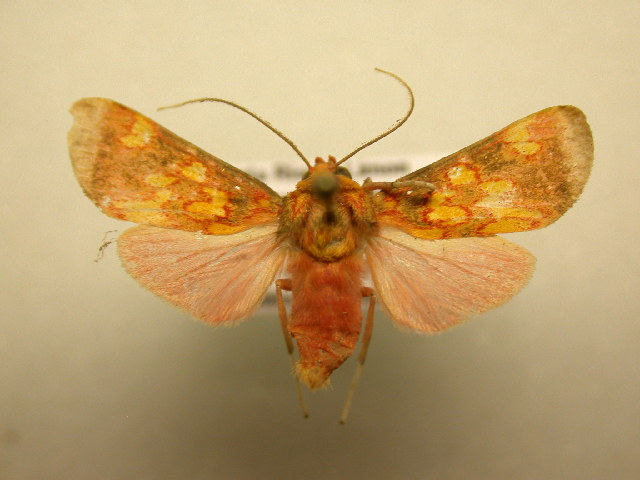

Scientific classification
- Domain: Eukaryota
- Kingdom: Animalia
- Phylum: Arthropoda
- Class: Insecta
- Order: Lepidoptera
- Superfamily: Noctuoidea
- Family: Erebidae
- Subfamily: Arctiinae
- Genus: Melese
- Species: M. flavimaculata

Binomial name
- Melese flavimaculata Dognin, 1899

= Melese flavimaculata =

Species of moth

Melese flavimaculata is a moth of the family Erebidae. It was described by Paul Dognin in 1899. It is found in French Guiana, Ecuador, Peru and Costa Rica.
