= Metareva aenescens =

Scientific classification
- Kingdom: Animalia
- Phylum: Arthropoda
- Clade: Pancrustacea
- Class: Insecta
- Order: Lepidoptera
- Superfamily: Noctuoidea
- Family: Erebidae
- Subfamily: Arctiinae
- Genus: Metareva
- Species: M. aenescens

Binomial name
- Metareva aenescens Hampson, 1900

Species of moth

Metareva aenescens is a moth of the subfamily Arctiinae. It was described by George Hampson in 1900. It is found in Bolivia.
