= Melese ocellata =

Scientific classification
- Kingdom: Animalia
- Phylum: Arthropoda
- Class: Insecta
- Order: Lepidoptera
- Superfamily: Noctuoidea
- Family: Erebidae
- Subfamily: Arctiinae
- Genus: Melese
- Species: M. ocellata

Binomial name
- Melese ocellata Hampson, 1901

Species of moth

Melese ocellata is a moth of the family Erebidae. It was described by George Hampson in 1901. It is found in French Guiana, Brazil and Mexico.
