= Melese castrena =

Scientific classification
- Kingdom: Animalia
- Phylum: Arthropoda
- Clade: Pancrustacea
- Class: Insecta
- Order: Lepidoptera
- Superfamily: Noctuoidea
- Family: Erebidae
- Subfamily: Arctiinae
- Genus: Melese
- Species: M. castrena

Binomial name
- Melese castrena Schaus, 1905

Species of moth

Melese castrena is a moth of the family Erebidae. It was described by William Schaus in 1905. It is found in Brazil.
