= Melese pusilla =

Scientific classification
- Domain: Eukaryota
- Kingdom: Animalia
- Phylum: Arthropoda
- Class: Insecta
- Order: Lepidoptera
- Superfamily: Noctuoidea
- Family: Erebidae
- Subfamily: Arctiinae
- Genus: Melese
- Species: M. pusilla

Binomial name
- Melese pusilla Rothschild, 1909

Species of moth

Melese pusilla is a moth of the family Erebidae. It was described by Walter Rothschild in 1909. It is found in French Guiana, Suriname, Guyana and Brazil.
