= Melese monima =

Scientific classification
- Domain: Eukaryota
- Kingdom: Animalia
- Phylum: Arthropoda
- Class: Insecta
- Order: Lepidoptera
- Superfamily: Noctuoidea
- Family: Erebidae
- Subfamily: Arctiinae
- Genus: Melese
- Species: M. monima

Binomial name
- Melese monima Schaus, 1910

Species of moth

Melese monima is a moth of the family Erebidae. It was described by William Schaus in 1910. It is found in Costa Rica.
