= Metareva =

Scientific classification
- Kingdom: Animalia
- Phylum: Arthropoda
- Class: Insecta
- Order: Lepidoptera
- Superfamily: Noctuoidea
- Family: Erebidae
- Subfamily: Arctiinae
- Tribe: Lithosiini
- Genus: Metareva; Hampson, 1900

Genus of moths

Metareva is a genus of moths in the subfamily Arctiinae. The genus was erected by George Hampson in 1900.

== Species ==
- Metareva aenescens Hampson, 1900
- Metareva albescens Dognin, 1902
- Metareva endoscota Hampson, 1909
- Metareva flavescens Dognin, 1902
- Metareva paulina Dognin
- Metareva susumuca Dognin
