= Metareva paulina =

Scientific classification
- Domain: Eukaryota
- Kingdom: Animalia
- Phylum: Arthropoda
- Class: Insecta
- Order: Lepidoptera
- Superfamily: Noctuoidea
- Family: Erebidae
- Subfamily: Arctiinae
- Genus: Metareva
- Species: M. paulina

Binomial name
- Metareva paulina Dognin, 1923

Species of moth

Metareva paulina is a moth of the subfamily Arctiinae. It was described by Paul Dognin in 1923. It is found in Brazil.
