= Melese binotata =

Scientific classification
- Kingdom: Animalia
- Phylum: Arthropoda
- Class: Insecta
- Order: Lepidoptera
- Superfamily: Noctuoidea
- Family: Erebidae
- Subfamily: Arctiinae
- Genus: Melese
- Species: M. binotata

Binomial name
- Melese binotata (Walker, 1856)

Synonyms
- Halysidota binotata Walker, 1856

Species of moth

Melese binotata is a moth of the family Erebidae. It was described by Francis Walker in 1856. It is found in Brazil.
