= Florida swamps =

Wetland habitats in Florida, USA

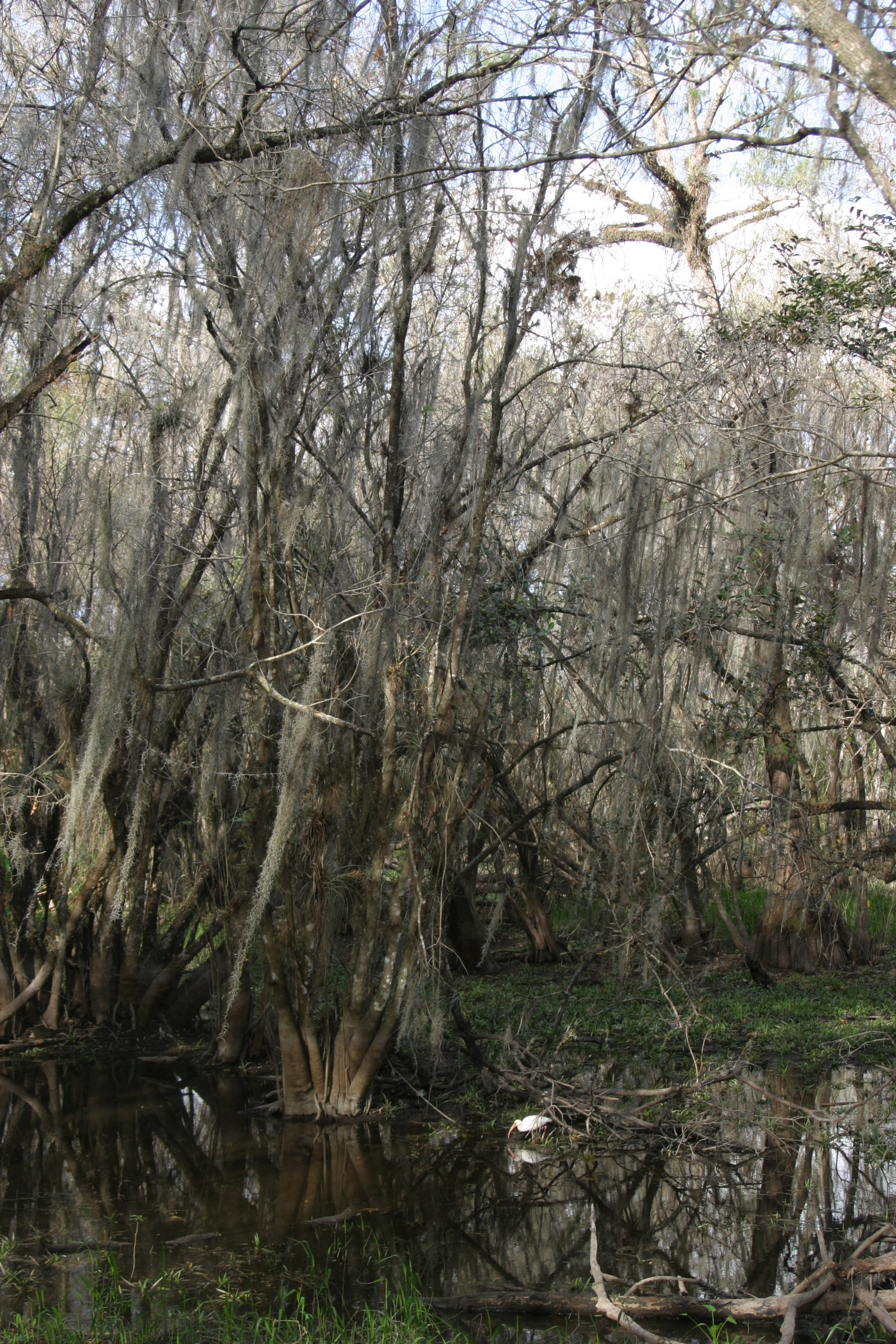
Cypress and white ibis during the winter dry season in Big Cypress National Preserve

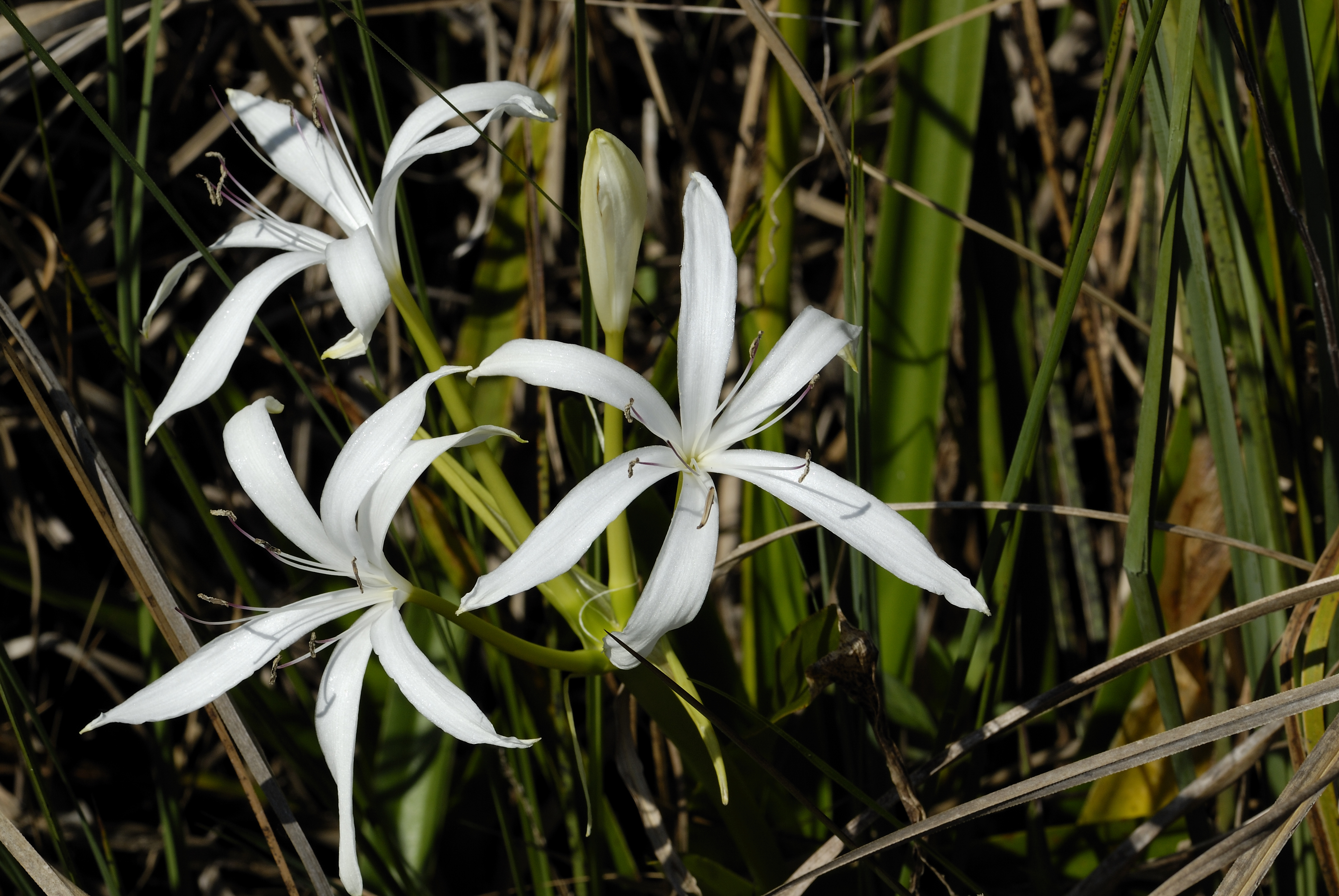
Swamp lily (Crinum americanum) on the Pa-hay-okee Trail in the Everglades

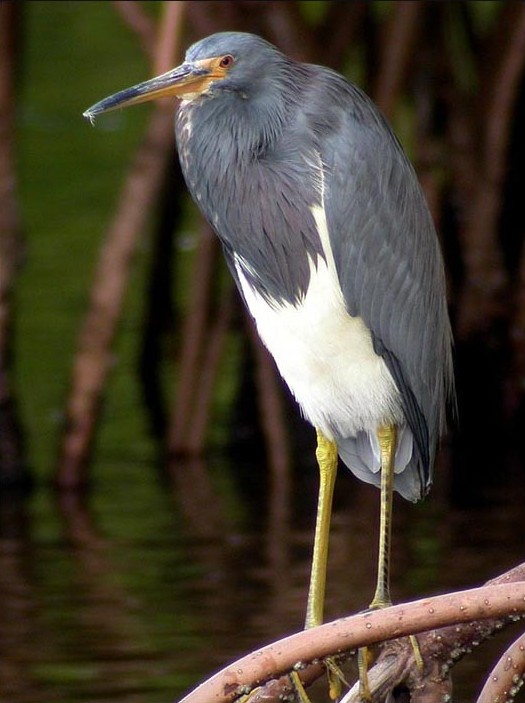
Tricolored heron in mangrove swamp

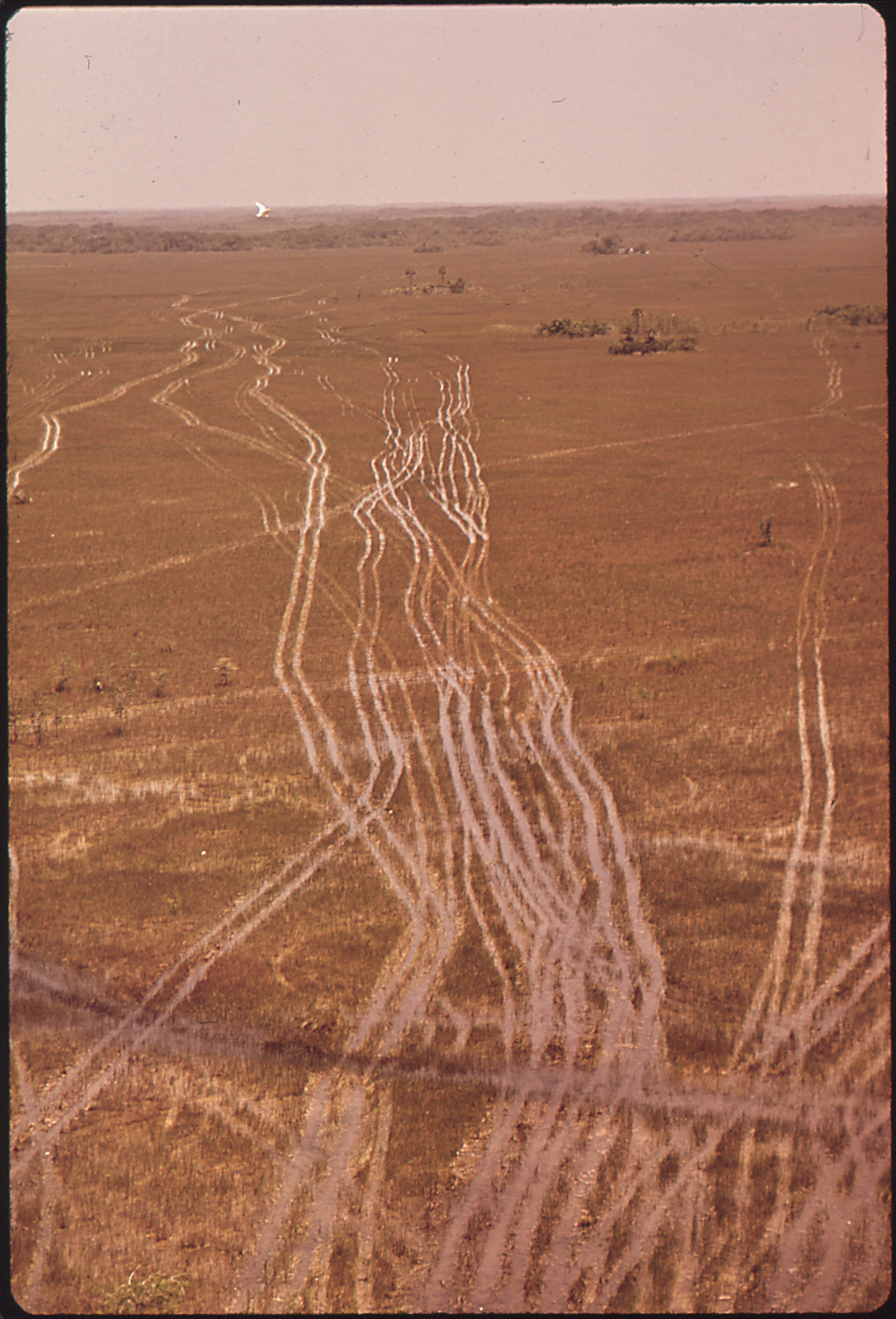
Swamp buggy tracks in the Big Cypress Swamp, 1972

Florida swamps include a variety of wetland habitats. Because of its high water table, substantial rainfall, and often flat geography, the U.S. state of Florida has a proliferation of swamp areas, some of them unique to the state.

Swamp types in Florida include:

- Cypress domes - most common swamp habitat in Florida
- Strand swamps
- Floodplain swamps
- Titi swamps
- Tupelo gum swamps
- Mangrove swamps

== Notable swamps ==
- Barley Barber Swamp, in Martin County
- Big Cypress Swamp, in southwest Florida
- Corkscrew Swamp Sanctuary in southwest Florida north of Naples, Florida
- Everglades, in south Florida
- Green Swamp (Florida) (including the Green Swamp Wilderness Preserve), Polk County
- Okefenokee Swamp, straddling the Georgia–Florida border
- Santa Fe Swamp, in north central Florida

== Animal species ==
Rare animals inhabiting swamps include:

- the Florida panther, an endangered subspecies of cougar (Puma concolor).
- the American alligator

== Plant species ==
Some of the species found in the various types of swamps include:

- Cypress
  - bald cypress (Taxodium distichum)
  - pond cypress (Taxodium ascendens)
- red mangrove (Rhizophora mangle)
- Palms
  - cabbage palm (Sabal palmetto)
  - Florida royal palm (Roystonea regia)
- sawgrass (Cladium jamaicense)
- Spanish moss (Tillandsia usneoides)
