= Melese dorothea =

Scientific classification
- Domain: Eukaryota
- Kingdom: Animalia
- Phylum: Arthropoda
- Class: Insecta
- Order: Lepidoptera
- Superfamily: Noctuoidea
- Family: Erebidae
- Subfamily: Arctiinae
- Genus: Melese
- Species: M. dorothea

Binomial name
- Melese dorothea (Stoll, [1782])

Synonyms
- Phalaena dorothea Stoll, [1782]; Zatrephes dorothea; Elysius dorothea; Phalaena cruenta Sepp, 1848

Species of moth

Melese dorothea is a moth of the family Erebidae. It was described by Caspar Stoll in 1782. It is found in French Guiana, Suriname, Brazil, Paraguay, Ecuador, Peru and Panama.
