= Melese quadrina =

Scientific classification
- Domain: Eukaryota
- Kingdom: Animalia
- Phylum: Arthropoda
- Class: Insecta
- Order: Lepidoptera
- Superfamily: Noctuoidea
- Family: Erebidae
- Subfamily: Arctiinae
- Genus: Melese
- Species: M. quadrina

Binomial name
- Melese quadrina Schaus, 1910

Species of moth

Melese quadrina is a moth of the family Erebidae. It was described by William Schaus in 1910. It is found in Costa Rica.
