= Melese postica =

Scientific classification
- Kingdom: Animalia
- Phylum: Arthropoda
- Class: Insecta
- Order: Lepidoptera
- Superfamily: Noctuoidea
- Family: Erebidae
- Subfamily: Arctiinae
- Genus: Melese
- Species: M. postica

Binomial name
- Melese postica Walker, 1854

Species of moth

Melese postica is a moth of the family Erebidae. Described by Francis Walker in 1854, it is found in Brazil, Peru, Suriname and Venezuela.
