= Melese rubricata =

Scientific classification
- Domain: Eukaryota
- Kingdom: Animalia
- Phylum: Arthropoda
- Class: Insecta
- Order: Lepidoptera
- Superfamily: Noctuoidea
- Family: Erebidae
- Subfamily: Arctiinae
- Genus: Melese
- Species: M. rubricata

Binomial name
- Melese rubricata Dognin, 1910

Species of moth

Melese rubricata is a moth of the family Erebidae. It was described by Paul Dognin in 1910. It is found in French Guiana.
