= Melese amastris =

Scientific classification
- Domain: Eukaryota
- Kingdom: Animalia
- Phylum: Arthropoda
- Class: Insecta
- Order: Lepidoptera
- Superfamily: Noctuoidea
- Family: Erebidae
- Subfamily: Arctiinae
- Genus: Melese
- Species: M. amastris

Binomial name
- Melese amastris (H. Druce, 1884)

Synonyms
- Neritos amastris H. Druce, 1884

Species of moth

Melese amastris is a moth of the family Erebidae. It was described by Herbert Druce in 1884. It is found in Mexico, Guatemala, Honduras, Costa Rica and Brazil.
