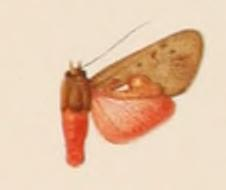

Scientific classification
- Domain: Eukaryota
- Kingdom: Animalia
- Phylum: Arthropoda
- Class: Insecta
- Order: Lepidoptera
- Superfamily: Noctuoidea
- Family: Erebidae
- Subfamily: Arctiinae
- Genus: Melese
- Species: M. hampsoni

Binomial name
- Melese hampsoni Rothschild, 1909

= Melese hampsoni =

Species of moth

Melese hampsoni is a moth of the family Erebidae first described by Walter Rothschild in 1909. It is found in Guyana, Brazil, Suriname, Peru, French Guiana and Ecuador.
