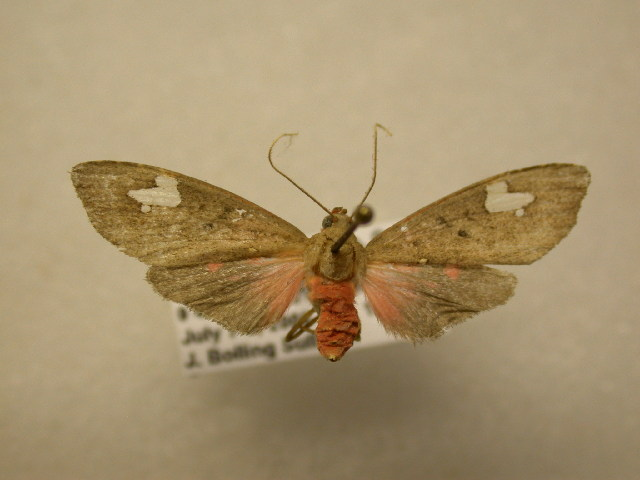

Scientific classification
- Domain: Eukaryota
- Kingdom: Animalia
- Phylum: Arthropoda
- Class: Insecta
- Order: Lepidoptera
- Superfamily: Noctuoidea
- Family: Erebidae
- Subfamily: Arctiinae
- Genus: Melese
- Species: M. chiriquensis

Binomial name
- Melese chiriquensis Schaus, 1905

= Melese chiriquensis =

Species of moth

Melese chiriquensis is a moth of the family Erebidae. It was described by William Schaus in 1905. It is found in Panama.
