= Melese lateritius =

Scientific classification
- Domain: Eukaryota
- Kingdom: Animalia
- Phylum: Arthropoda
- Class: Insecta
- Order: Lepidoptera
- Superfamily: Noctuoidea
- Family: Erebidae
- Subfamily: Arctiinae
- Genus: Melese
- Species: M. lateritius

Binomial name
- Melese lateritius (Möschler, 1878)

Synonyms
- Malabus lateritius Möschler, 1878; Melese niger Toulgoët, 1983

Species of moth

Melese lateritius is a moth of the family Erebidae. It was described by Heinrich Benno Möschler in 1878. It is found in Suriname and French Guiana.
