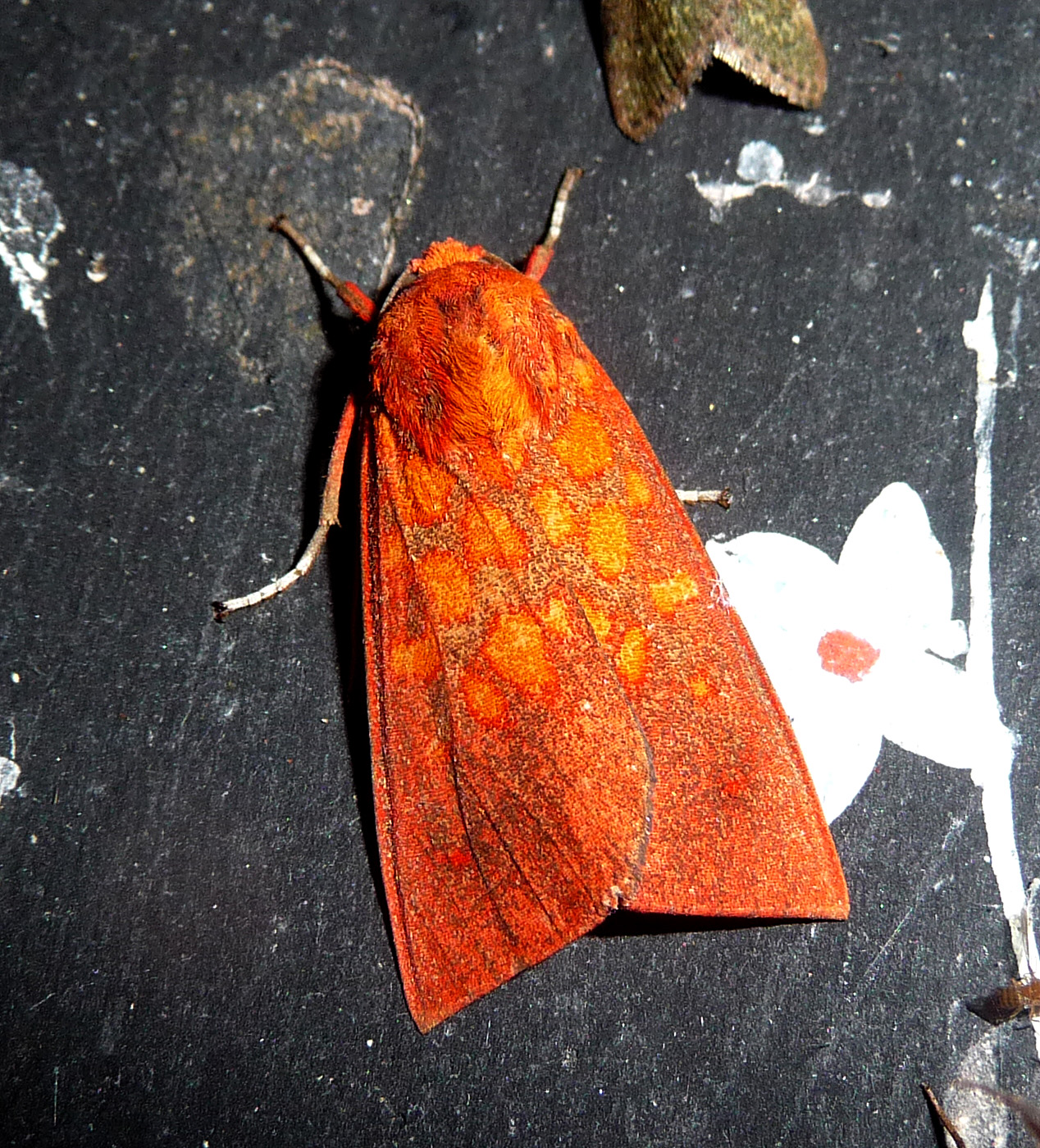

Scientific classification
- Domain: Eukaryota
- Kingdom: Animalia
- Phylum: Arthropoda
- Class: Insecta
- Order: Lepidoptera
- Superfamily: Noctuoidea
- Family: Erebidae
- Subfamily: Arctiinae
- Genus: Melese
- Species: M. intensa

Binomial name
- Melese intensa Rothschild, 1910

= Melese intensa =

Species of moth

Melese intensa is a moth of the family Erebidae. It was first described by Walter Rothschild in 1910 using specimens collected at San Antonio in western Colombia. These syntypes are held at the Natural History Museum, London. Rothschild originally named it as the subspecies Melesse[sic] chozeba intensa.
