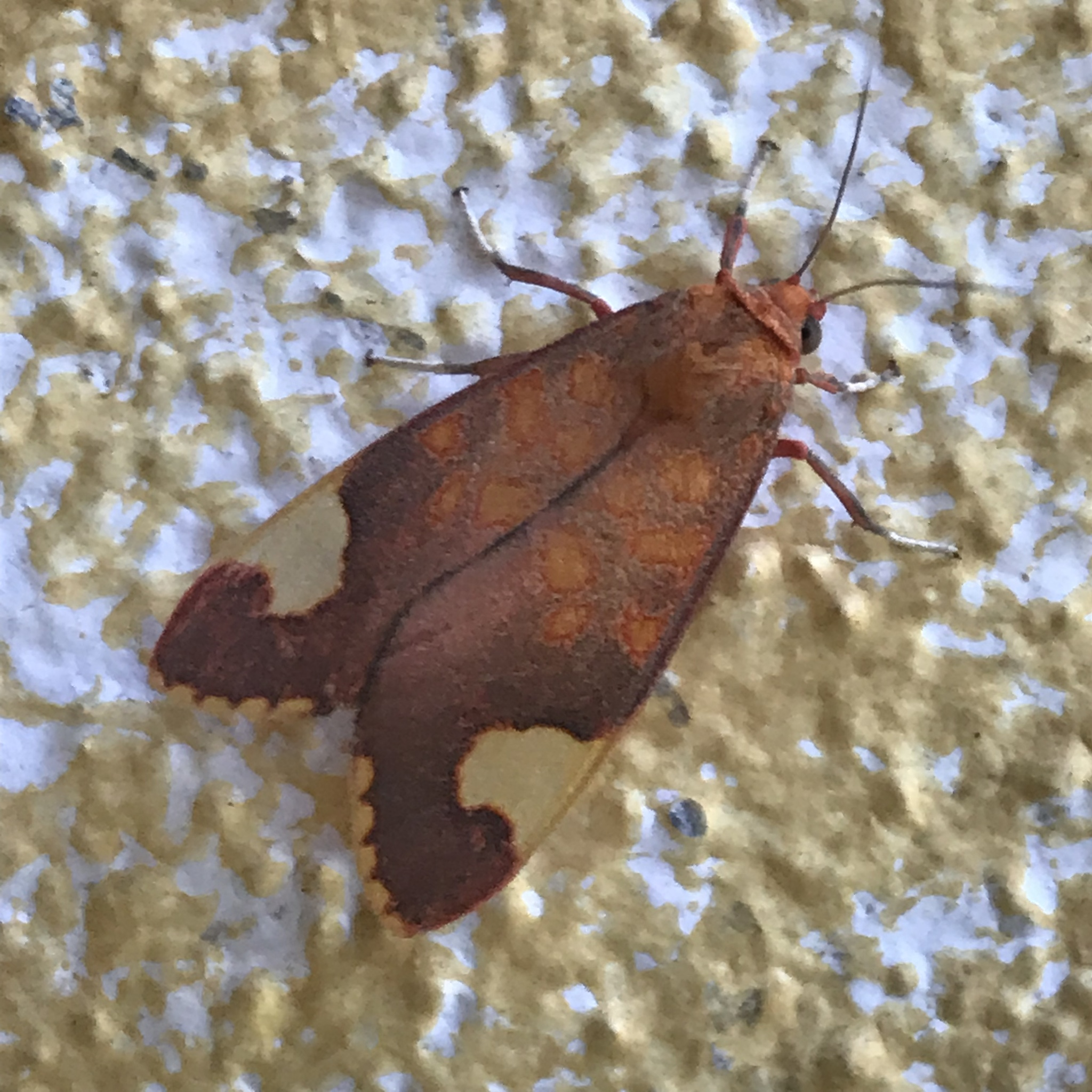

Scientific classification
- Kingdom: Animalia
- Phylum: Arthropoda
- Clade: Pancrustacea
- Class: Insecta
- Order: Lepidoptera
- Superfamily: Noctuoidea
- Family: Erebidae
- Subfamily: Arctiinae
- Subtribe: Phaegopterina
- Genus: Melese; Walker, 1854

Synonyms
- Malabus Walker, 1855; Idioctetus Herrich-Schäffer, [1856]; Heteromelese Zikán, 1968

= Melese =

Genus of moths

Melese is a genus of moths in the family Erebidae. The genus was erected by Francis Walker in 1854.

== Species ==
- Melese albogrisea Rothschild, 1909
- Melese amastris (Druce, 1884)
- Melese aprepia Dognin, 1908
- Melese asana (Druce, 1884)
- Melese babosa (Dognin, 1894)
- Melese barbuti Vincent, 2004
- Melese binotata (Walker, 1856)
- Melese castrena Schaus, 1905
- Melese chiriquensis Schaus, 1905
- Melese chozeba (Druce, 1884)
- Melese columbiana Rothschild, 1909
- Melese costimacula Joicey & Talbot, 1916
- Melese dorothea (Stoll, [1782])
- Melese drucei Rothschild, 1909
- Melese endopyra Hampson, 1901
- Melese erythrastis Dognin, 1907
- Melese farri Murphy & Garraway, 2007
- Melese flavescens Joicey & Talbot, 1918
- Melese flavimaculata Dognin, 1899
- Melese hampsoni Rothschild, 1909
- Melese hebetis Rothschild, 1909
- Melese incertus (Walker, 1855)
- Melese inconspicua Rothschild, 1909
- Melese innocua Dognin, 1911
- Melese intensa Rothschild, 1910
- Melese klagesi Rothschild, 1909
- Melese laodamia (Druce, 1884)
- Melese lateritius (Möschler, 1878)
- Melese leucanioides (Herrich-Schäffer, [1856])
- Melese levequei Vincent, 2004
- Melese monima Schaus, 1910
- Melese nebulosa Joicey & Talbot, 1916
- Melese nigromaculata Rothschild, 1909
- Melese ocellata Hampson, 1901
- Melese paranensis Dognin, 1911
- Melese peruviana Rothschild, 1909
- Melese postica Walker, 1854
- Melese pumila Dognin, 1908
- Melese punctata Rothschild, 1909
- Melese pusilla Rothschild, 1909
- Melese quadrina Schaus, 1910
- Melese quadripunctata Rothschild, 1909
- Melese rubricata Dognin, 1910
- Melese russatus (H. Edwards, 1884)
- Melese signata Joicey & Talbot, 1916
- Melese sixola Schaus, 1910
- Melese sordida Rothschild, 1909
- Melese sotrema Schaus, 1920
- Melese underwoodi (Rothschild, 1917)

== Former species ==
- Melese niger Toulgoët, 1983
