= Metareva endoscota =

Scientific classification
- Kingdom: Animalia
- Phylum: Arthropoda
- Class: Insecta
- Order: Lepidoptera
- Superfamily: Noctuoidea
- Family: Erebidae
- Subfamily: Arctiinae
- Genus: Metareva
- Species: M. endoscota

Binomial name
- Metareva endoscota Hampson, 1909

Species of moth

Metareva endoscota is a moth of the subfamily Arctiinae. It was described by George Hampson in 1909. It is found in Peru.
