= Melese paranensis =

Scientific classification
- Domain: Eukaryota
- Kingdom: Animalia
- Phylum: Arthropoda
- Class: Insecta
- Order: Lepidoptera
- Superfamily: Noctuoidea
- Family: Erebidae
- Subfamily: Arctiinae
- Genus: Melese
- Species: M. paranensis

Binomial name
- Melese paranensis Dognin, 1911

Species of moth

Melese paranensis is a moth of the family Erebidae. It was described by Paul Dognin in 1911. It is found in Argentina.
