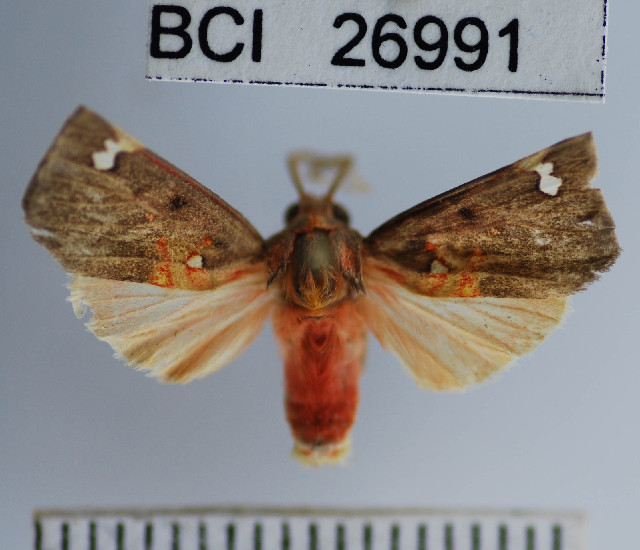

Scientific classification
- Domain: Eukaryota
- Kingdom: Animalia
- Phylum: Arthropoda
- Class: Insecta
- Order: Lepidoptera
- Superfamily: Noctuoidea
- Family: Erebidae
- Subfamily: Arctiinae
- Genus: Melese
- Species: M. sixola

Binomial name
- Melese sixola Schaus, 1910

Synonyms
- Melese frater Schaus, 1910

= Melese sixola =

Species of moth

Melese sixola is a moth of the family Erebidae. It was described by William Schaus in 1910. It is found in Costa Rica.

== Subspecies ==
- Melese sixola sixola
- Melese sixola frater Schaus, 1910
