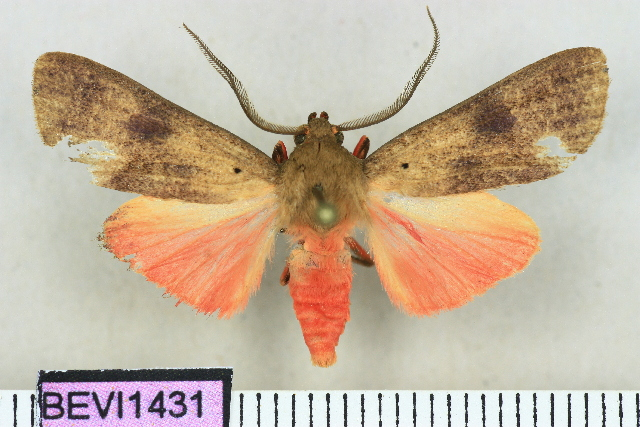

Scientific classification
- Domain: Eukaryota
- Kingdom: Animalia
- Phylum: Arthropoda
- Class: Insecta
- Order: Lepidoptera
- Superfamily: Noctuoidea
- Family: Erebidae
- Subfamily: Arctiinae
- Genus: Melese
- Species: M. farri

Binomial name
- Melese farri Murphy & Garraway, 2007

= Melese farri =

Species of moth

Melese farri is a moth of the family Erebidae. It was described by Catherine P. Murphy and Eric Garraway in 2007. It is found on Jamaica.
