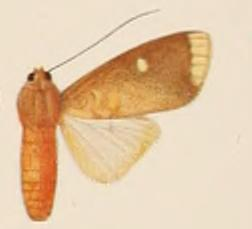

Scientific classification
- Domain: Eukaryota
- Kingdom: Animalia
- Phylum: Arthropoda
- Class: Insecta
- Order: Lepidoptera
- Superfamily: Noctuoidea
- Family: Erebidae
- Subfamily: Arctiinae
- Genus: Melese
- Species: M. hebetis

Binomial name
- Melese hebetis Rothschild, 1909

= Melese hebetis =

Species of moth

Melese hebetis is a moth of the family Erebidae first described by Walter Rothschild in 1909. It is found in Peru.
