= Melese underwoodi =

Scientific classification
- Domain: Eukaryota
- Kingdom: Animalia
- Phylum: Arthropoda
- Class: Insecta
- Order: Lepidoptera
- Superfamily: Noctuoidea
- Family: Erebidae
- Subfamily: Arctiinae
- Genus: Melese
- Species: M. underwoodi

Binomial name
- Melese underwoodi (Rothschild, 1917)

Synonyms
- Elysius underwoodi Rothschild, 1917

Species of moth

Melese underwoodi is a moth of the family Erebidae. It was described by Walter Rothschild in 1917. It is found in Costa Rica.
