= Melese flavescens =

Scientific classification
- Domain: Eukaryota
- Kingdom: Animalia
- Phylum: Arthropoda
- Class: Insecta
- Order: Lepidoptera
- Superfamily: Noctuoidea
- Family: Erebidae
- Subfamily: Arctiinae
- Genus: Melese
- Species: M. flavescens

Binomial name
- Melese flavescens Joicey & Talbot, 1918

Species of moth

Melese flavescens is a moth of the family Erebidae. It was described by James John Joicey and George Talbot in 1918. It is found in Argentina.
