= Metareva flavescens =

Scientific classification
- Domain: Eukaryota
- Kingdom: Animalia
- Phylum: Arthropoda
- Class: Insecta
- Order: Lepidoptera
- Superfamily: Noctuoidea
- Family: Erebidae
- Subfamily: Arctiinae
- Genus: Metareva
- Species: M. flavescens

Binomial name
- Metareva flavescens Dognin, 1902

Synonyms
- Metareva semidivisa Rothschild, 1912

Species of moth

Metareva flavescens is a moth of the subfamily Arctiinae. It was described by Paul Dognin in 1902. It is found in Argentina.
