= List of events in Ponce, Puerto Rico =

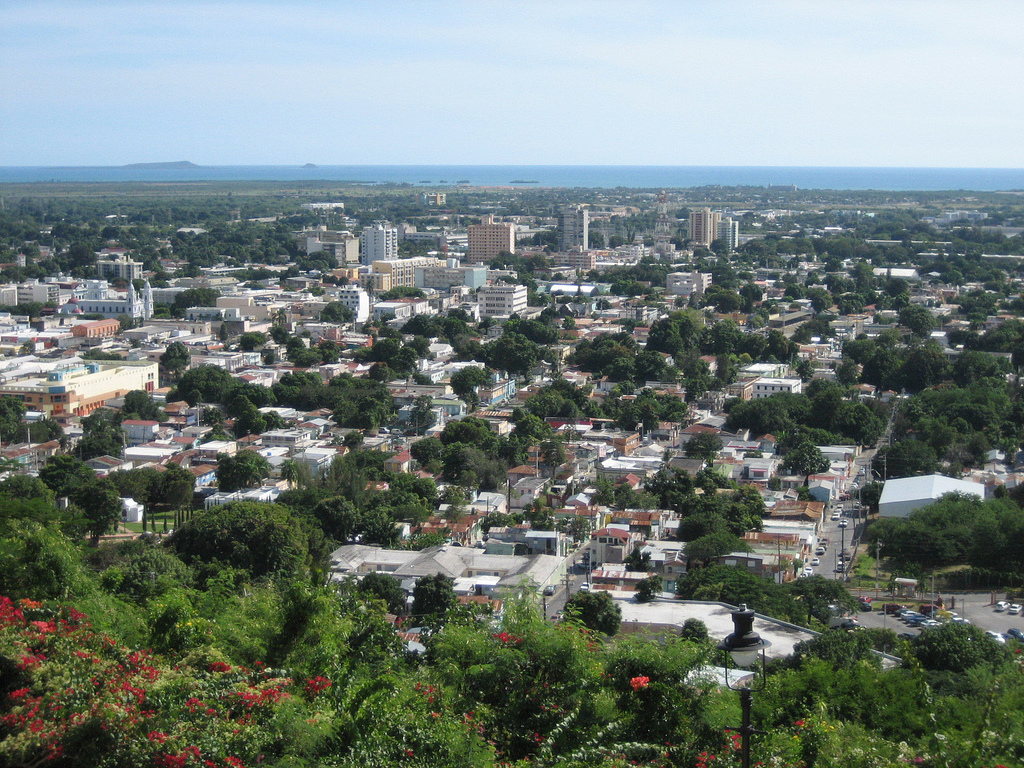
The City of Ponce, is a 75-minute highway ride from San Juan

This is a list of events in Ponce, Puerto Rico. Ponce is Puerto Rico's second largest city outside the San Juan metropolitan area. It is located in the southern coast of Puerto Rico, about a 75-minute drive via Autopista Las Americas or reachable via plane as a destination at the Mercedita International Airport or by cruise line at the Port of the Americas. Ponce holds numerous annual events. Only the most prominent and popular ones are listed below.

== Ponce events list summary table ==
The following table lists recurring events in Ponce by their month of occurrence. A listing sorted by any of the other fields can be obtained by clicking on the header of the field. For example, clicking on "Year Established" will sort events by the year when the event started.

No.	Event	Month	Day	Photo	Barrio	Venue	Type	Year Established	Related to	Celebrations	Frequency
1	Carnaval de Vejigantes	January	Varies		Playa	Av. Padre Noel	Cultural	1991	Local Traditions	Parade	Yearly
2	El Polvorín Memorial	January	25		Português	Cementerio Civil de Ponce	Memorial	1900	El Polvorín fire	Memorial service	Yearly
3	Carnaval de Ponce	February	Varies		Segundo	Plaza Las Delicias	Cultural	1850	Lent	Parades, Music, Food	Yearly
4	Ponce Massacre Memorial	March	21		Cuarto	Museo de la Masacre de Ponce	Memorial	1938	Ponce massacre	Memorial service	Yearly
5	Feria de Artesanías de Ponce	April	Varies		Segundo	Plaza Las Delicias	Cultural	1974	Centro Cultural	Crafts, Workshops	Yearly
6	Las Justas	April	Varies		Canas	Francisco Montaner Stadium	Sports	1993	College athletics	Sports competitions, Music, Parties	Yearly
7	Ponce Jazz Festival	April	Varies		Cuarto	Concha Acústica de Ponce	Music	2012	Jazz music	Music	Yearly
8	Fiesta Nacional de la Danza	May	Varies		Tercero	Teatro La Perla	Cultural	1897~	Danza	Music, Dancing, Crafts, Food	Yearly
9	Ponce Grand Prix de Atletismo	May	Varies		Canas	Francisco Montaner Stadium	Sports	2007	IAAF World Challenge	Sports competition	Yearly
10	Festival Nacional Afrocaribeño	June	Varies		Capitanejo	Sector La Cuarta	Cultural	1999	Black cultural heritage	Music, Dancing, Crafts, Food	Yearly
11	Cruce a Nado Internacional	September	1st Sunday		Playa	Bahía de Ponce	Sports	1980	Bahía de Ponce	Swimming competition	Yearly
12	Día Mundial de Ponce	September	Varies		Segundo	Plaza Las Delicias	Cultural	2012	Culture and History	Parade	Yearly
13	Mameyes Landslide Memorial	October	7		Tercero	Mameyes Memorial Museum	Memorial	1986	1985 Mameyes tragedy	Memorial service	Yearly
14	Feria de Artesanías Plaza del Caribe	October	Varies		Playa	Plaza del Caribe	Cultural	1980	Plaza del Caribe	Crafts	Yearly
15	Festival de Bomba y Plena de San Antón	November	Varies		San Antón	San Antón	Cultural	1978	Bomba and Plena	Music, Dancing	Yearly
16	Bienal de Arte de Ponce	November	Varies		Playa	UPRP	Art	1986	Commission on the Arts	Art exhibition	Biennale
17	Ponce Marathon	December	12		Segundo	Plaza Las Delicias	Sports	1970	Virgin of Guadalupe	Marathon	Yearly
18	Las Mañanitas	December	12		Segundo	Plaza Las Delicias	Cultural	1964	Culture and Religion	Parade	Yearly
19	Fiestas patronales	December	Varies		Segundo	Plaza Las Delicias	Cultural / Religious	1850	History and Religion	Music, Dancing, Crafts, Food	Yearly
20	Concierto de Navidad (Christmas Concert)	December	Varies		Tercero	Teatro La Perla	Cultural	1983	Christmas	Concert	Yearly
21	Noches de Placita	All	Last Friday of the month		Playa	Plaza 65 de Infantería	Cultural	2018	Local Traditions	Music, Dancing, Crafts, Food	Monthly

Key:
~ = Date is approximate

== See also ==
- List of hotels in Ponce, Puerto Rico
- Nightlife in Ponce, Puerto Rico
