= Las Mañanitas (celebration) =

Annual event held in Ponce, Puerto Rico, dedicated to Our Lady of Guadalupe

- Official name: Las Mañanitas
- Observed by: Ponceños in Ponce, Puerto Rico
- Type: Local, religious, historical
- Significance: Celebration in honor of Our Lady of Guadalupe, the patron lady of the city
- Celebrations: Religious procession, cultural festivals
- Observances: Yearly
- Date: 12 December
- Next time: 12 December 2026
- Frequency: annual
- Related to: Culture and Religion

Las Mañanitas is an annual event held in Ponce, Puerto Rico, dedicated to Our Lady of Guadalupe. It consists of a pre-dawn popular religious procession, followed by a Catholic Mass, and a breakfast for attendees hosted by the municipal government. It takes place every 12 December, and is sponsored by the Roman Catholic Diocese of Ponce as well as attended by Catholic leaders from across Puerto Rico. Widely covered by the press, the annual event is attended by over 10,000 people, including religious and political leaders and the general public. Due to the coronavirus pandemic, the 2020 feast was modified in line with safety protocols: the public procession was cancelled, the day’s solemn Mass was broadcast on live television, and people were required to celebrate within their homes.

== History ==
The celebration started in 1964, but the circumstances of its origin are uncertain. Some say it was started by immigrant Mexican engineers while others state it was started by Spaniards from Extremadura, Spain. During the celebration participants and attendees join in singing together the traditional Las Mañanitas song while Mexican mariachis provide the background music. The city of Ponce offers a free breakfast to everyone present at the historic Ponce City Hall after the religious Mass concludes.

== Venue ==
The outdoors/indoors pre-dawn festival-parade starts at Parque del Tricentenario, runs down Calle Isabel and ends at Catedral de Nuestra Señora de Guadalupe at Plaza Las Delicias in downtown Ponce.

== Attendance and cost ==
The early morning, pre-dawn celebration is attended by over 10,000 people, including mayors and other prominent figures. In 2016, the event, together with the lighting of the City Hall Christmas decorations and the kickoff of its fiestas patronales, cost the municipality around $30,000.

== Schedule ==
The celebration occurs every 12 December and starts at 4:00am. The city of Ponce offers a free breakfast to everyone present at the historic Ponce City Hall after the religious Mass concludes. Mariachis continue their music while attendees have their breakfast.

While not a part of this celebration, in the past the Government of Ponce has scheduled the Ponce Marathon to occur on the same day as the Las Mañanitas celebration. Marathon runners get an early start (5am) and complete their run just after the Catholic Mass has ended and while the public municipal city breakfast is taking place.

== See also ==
- Bienal de Arte de Ponce
- Carnaval de Ponce
- Carnaval de Vejigantes
- Día Mundial de Ponce
- Feria de Artesanías de Ponce
- Festival de Bomba y Plena de San Antón
- Festival Nacional Afrocaribeño
- Festival Nacional de la Quenepa
- Fiesta Nacional de la Danza
- Ponce Jazz Festival
