= Fiestas patronales de Ponce =

Annual celebration held in Ponce, Puerto Rico

Coordinates: 18°0′00″N 66°37′00″W

- Also called: Fiesta de pueblo
- Type: Local, cultural
- Celebrations: Music, food, dancing, crafts, rides
- Observances: Patron saint
- Date: Last friday of the month
- Frequency: Yearly
- First time: 1692 (approx.)
- Related to: Virgin of Guadalupe Patron saint

Fiestas patronales de Ponce is an annual cultural celebration held at Plaza Las Delicias in Ponce, Puerto Rico. The celebration, which commonly lasts three days, takes place in late December. Ponce's Fiestas patronales are heavily influenced by Spanish culture and religion, and are a tradition held in honor of the city's patron saint, the Virgen of Guadalupe. As such the celebration may be as old as the town itself (1692). The festivities usually include religious processions honoring its Catholic heritage. However, elements of African and local culture have been incorporated as well. They also feature parades, games, artisans, amusement rides, regional food, and live entertainment. It is attended mostly by people from the city of Ponce and its 18 surrounding barrios, but also people from all over Puerto Rico. The free event's attendance is estimated in the hundreds every day.

== Contents and purpose ==
Fiestas patronales de Ponce is organized and held by the government of the municipality of Ponce. The cost of the event to the municipality is around $30,000. Fiestas patronales de Ponce aim to celebrate a cultural tradition while also strengthening family bonds, provide a venue to enhance community ties, and keep local traditions alive. They typically brings together over 100 artists, including some 10 music bands, choreographed dancers, plus the thousands of locals who join in. This celebration has been described as a "townspeople feast." Besides music, dance and food, Fiestas patronales de Ponce also features amusement rides, artisans, cheerleaders, jugglers, and arts and crafts, among other attractions.

== List of events ==
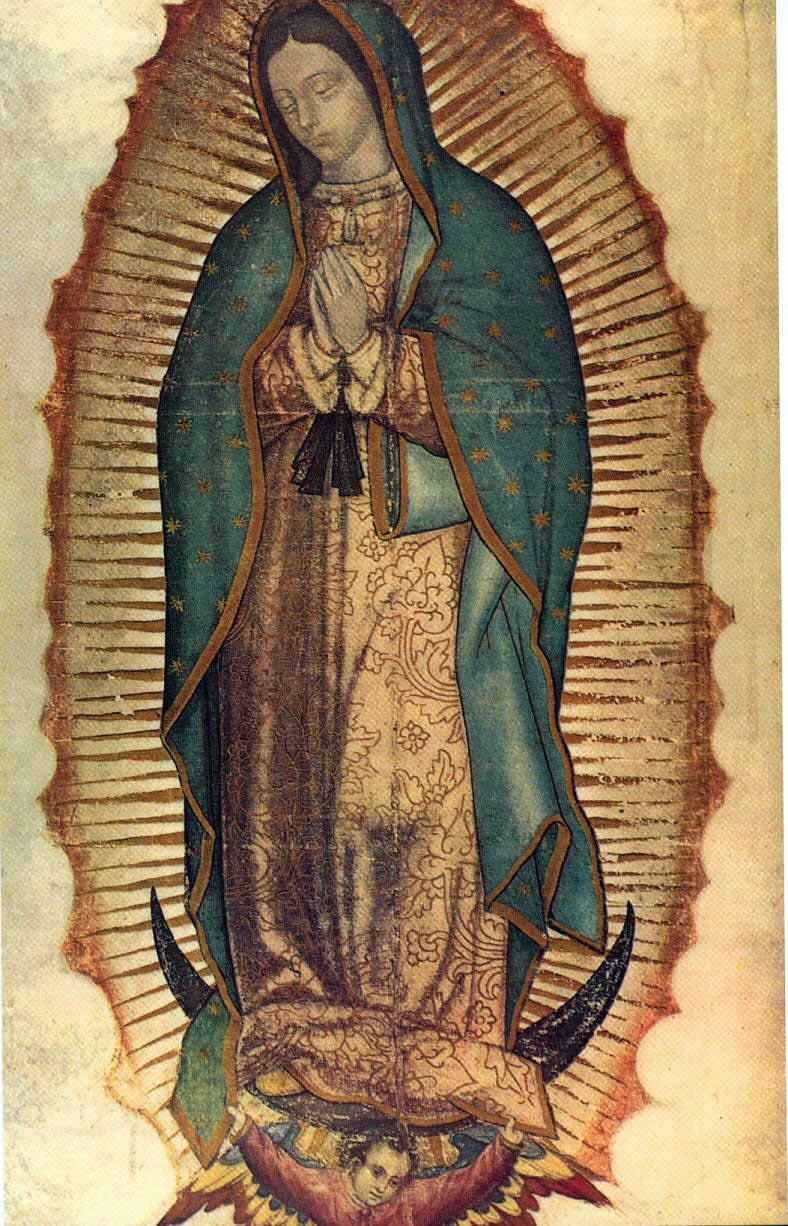
Above Virgen of Guadalupe, Ponce's patron saint.

Fiestas patronales are usually preceded by the lighting of the downtown Ponce Christmas decorations and the Nativity scene at the Ponce City Hall in early December. This kickoff event is frequently attended by the Mayor of Ponce. This kickoff is also traditionally the unofficial precursor for the opening of Christmas-time season kiosk shops at Plaza Las Delicias, a tradition that has taken place since at least the middle of the 20th century. Fiestas patronales de Ponce usually start on a Friday. The following is the list of events for the 2019 Fiestas patronales, which are typical of the other years.

Friday:

9:00 a.m. – 2:00 p.m.: Victoria Sanabria: Trovando por tu salud con redes del Sureste
6:00 p.m. – 7:00 p.m.: Ricardo Jesús y su orquesta
7:00 p.m. – 8:00 p.m.: Academia Julie Mayoral
8:00 p.m. – 9:00 p.m.: Ballet Señorial
9:30 p.m. – 10:30 p.m.: Jíbara Banda
11:00 p.m. – 12:30 a.m.: Moncho Rivera

Saturday:

5:30 p.m. – 7:00 p.m.: Instituto de Música Juan Morel Campos
7:00 p.m. – 8:00 p.m.: Catholic Mass
8:00 p.m. – 9:00 p.m.: Live to Dance Academy
9:30 p.m. – 10:30 p.m.: Raúl Armando “El Rau”
11:00 p.m. – 12:30 a.m.: Kevvo

Sunday:

5:00 a.m.: Maratón de La Guadalupe
2:00 p.m. – 3:00 p.m.: The Magnific Dragon
3:00 p.m. – 4:00 p.m.: Payaso Remi
4:00 p.m. – 5:00 p.m.: Catholic Mass
5:30 p.m. – 6:30 p.m.: Centenaria Banda Municipal de Ponce
7:00 p.m. – 8:00 p.m.: Catholic Mass
8:30 p.m. – 9:30 p.m.: Hermanos Sanabria
9:30 p.m. – 9:45 p.m.: Ballet Salsa Sur
10:00 p.m. – 11:00 p.m.: La Sonora Ponceña

External videos
- See the 2019 Fiestas Patronales de Ponce at Plaza Las Delicias, here

== See also ==
- Fiestas patronales in Puerto Rico
- Feria de Artesanías de Ponce
- Ponce Jazz Festival
- Fiesta Nacional de la Danza
- Día Mundial de Ponce
- Festival Nacional de la Quenepa
- Bienal de Arte de Ponce
- Festival de Bomba y Plena de San Antón
- Carnaval de Vejigantes
