= Sand Masters =

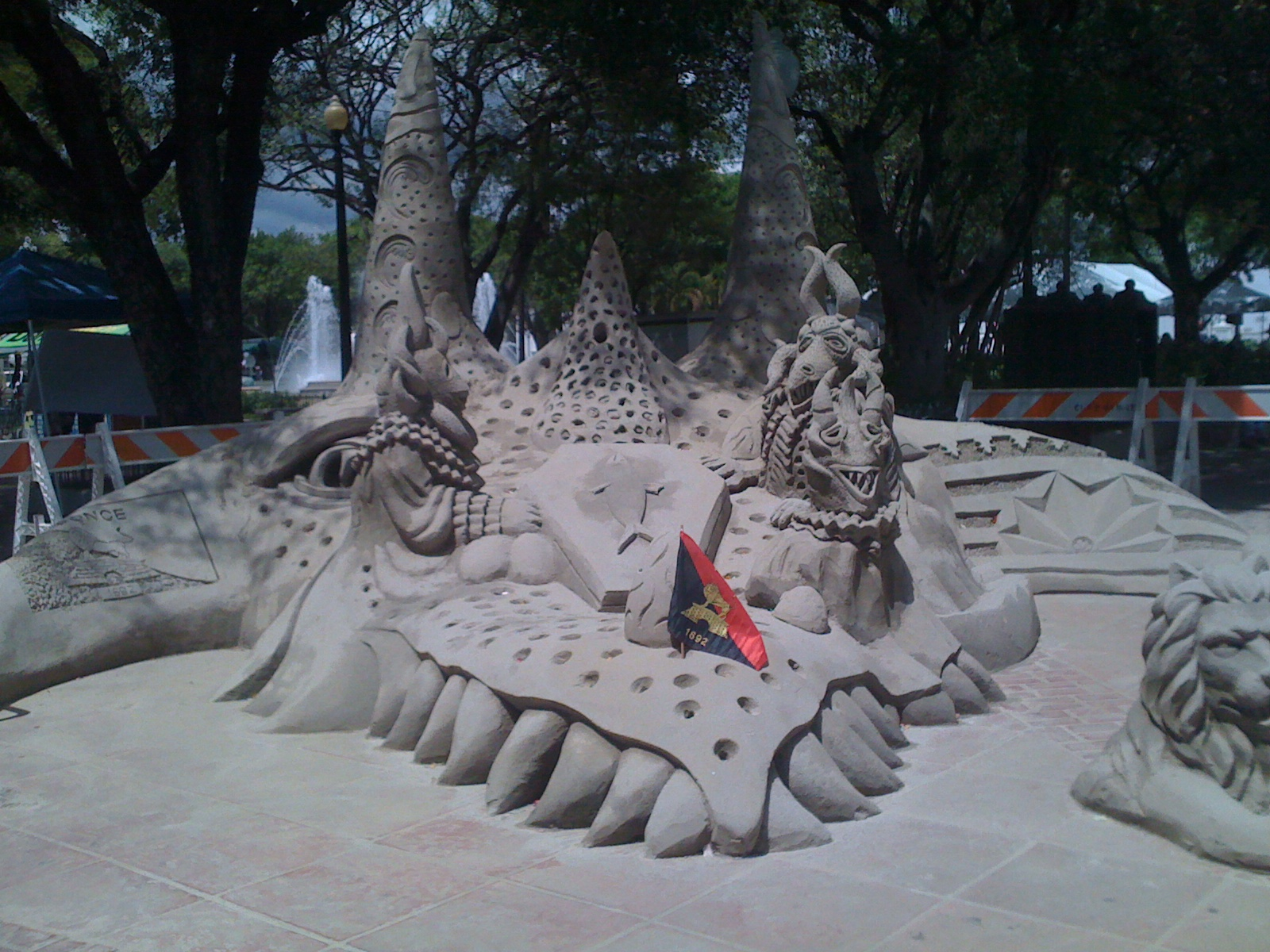
- Carnival Puerto Rico sculpture
- Genre: Reality television
- Starring: See list of sculptors below
- Country of origin: United States
- Original language: English
- No. of seasons: 2
- No. of episodes: 29

Production
- Executive producers: Jim Casey; Ross Kaiman
- Production location: Various
- Cinematography: Guy Liveth; Rob Toth
- Editors: Grady Cooper; Marcella Serrano; Emi Macuaga; Matt Harry; Kevin Borque; Allison Dunn; Evan Fisher; Patrick Reilly; Narumi Inatsugu
- Camera setup: Multiple-camera setup
- Running time: 30 minutes
- Production company: Painless Entertainment

Original release
- Network: Travel Channel
- Release: June 1, 2011 – July 8, 2012

Related
- Sand Blasters; Sand Wars

Sand Masters is an American reality television series that premiered on June 1, 2011, on the Travel Channel. The show follows a team of sand sculptors as they travel to various locales to create elaborate sand structures for their business clients. The first two episodes of the series premiered on June 1, 2011, at 10:00pm, but it was moved to Sundays at 7:00pm EST. Season two aired on Thursday, April 5, 2012, at 9:00pm EST. The show was canceled after Season 2.

== Premise ==
"A team of six talented sand sculptors travel all over the world to create unimaginable, massive masterpieces made from sand. These "Sand Masters" design colossal works of art while battling seemingly insurmountable challenges—unpredictable weather, wildly ambitious designs and overly demanding business clients."

The series intro is narrated by Rusty Croft. The first series intro, set to Mr. Sandman:

My name is Rusty and I love playing in the sand, but it didn't exactly pay the bills. So I teamed up with my best friend Kirk and started a new business. We recruited some of the best sculptors we know. Now we travel all over the world to work on the craziest jobs and we turn ordinary sand into masterpieces.

Second season intro:

My name is Rusty Croft. I carved out an unusual career. I'm a sand sculptor. I've got the best team of artists in the business. We travel the world. Collect crazy clients. And create mind-blowing masterpieces. If you can dream it, we can make it out of sand.

== Sand sculptors ==
- Rusty Croft - Team leader and sand sculptor planner/all around designer.
- Kirk Rademaker - Designs abstract, mechanical pieces in the sand with his over-the-top style.
- Sue McGrew - Sculpting figures in the sand is her specialty with her organic, flowing feminine style.
- Morgan Rudluff - Great at carving logos, lettering, and banners out of sand.
- Matt Long - sand sculptor from New York, great at carving figures and fine details.
- Andy Gertler - Architectural designs, great at carving buildings and structures.
- Chris Guinto - A 10-year sand sculptor specializing in marine life and all kinds of animals. He also wrestles crocodiles and alligators for a living. (Ep.12, 13, 16/Joins the team full-time in Season 2)

== Production crew (additional) ==
Note: Crew members not listed in production infobox above.

- Co-Executive Producers - Ross Kaiman, Aaron Fishman
- VP Finance & Operations - Frances Fleming
- Line Producer - Laura Sweet
- Supervising Post Producer - Steve Durgin
- Story Producers - Ali Zubik, Graham Hughes, Eric Smith, Kim Devore, Matt Pella
- Segment Producer - Angela Shin
- Associate Producers - Derek Helwig, Jason Wright
- Field Production Coordinator - Alex Fleming
- Office Production Coordinator - Daniel Meincke
- Executive Assistant - Jennifer Corley
- Camera - Jonathan Wenstrup, Vanessa Joy Smith (additional)
- Director of Post Production - Doug Levy
- Post Production Supervisor - Stuart Otroshkin
- Post Production Coordinator - Doug Sanford

== Episodes ==
=== Season 1 (2011) ===
No.	Title	Original release date
1	"Ringling Bros. Miami"	June 1, 2011
In the series premiere, the Sand Masters team travels to Miami, Florida, to build a sand sculpture for the opening night of the Ringling Bros. and Barnum & Bailey Circus and to celebrate P. T. Barnum's 200th birthday. Their 60-ton sculpture features an acrobat, an elephant, and a motorcycle, and incorporated into the design a surprise fiery explosion.
2	"Costa Rica Coffee"	June 1, 2011
The team travels to Costa Rica to meet their hyperactive client who asks them to create a coffee-themed sand sculpture celebrating the international launch of her local coffee company. While there, they learn to make and serve the perfect cup of coffee and visit a remote coffee plantation, which inspires them to incorporate coffee grinds and a working coffee maker into their sand sculpture.
3	"Aspen Snowboarding"	June 8, 2011
The team sculpts a centerpiece called "Aspen Snowmass" for the "Sandy Pants Rail Jam", a ski-and-snowboard competition at Buttermilk ski resort in Aspen, Colorado. Their abstract design includes a 30-foot box rail for riders to grind their boards and skis on.
4	"Star Wars Legoland"	June 19, 2011
The team celebrates the newest attraction at Legoland in Carlsbad, California by building a Star WarsLego-themed sand sculpture that features giant Lego building blocks and figures in the sand.
5	"Royal Hawaiian Hotel"	June 26, 2011
The team travels to Waikiki, Hawaii to build an island-theme sand sculpture with colored lights for the world famous Royal Hawaiian Hotel celebrating their $70 million renovation. They create Hawaii's first king and queen (King Kamehameha I and Queen Kaahumanu) out of sand and their summer home of Coconut Grove right on the queen's birthday.
6	"Napa Sparkling Wine"	July 10, 2011
The sculptors head to Domaine Carneros sparkling wine company in Napa Valley, California to build a sand sculpture featuring a giant wine bottle designed to flow Champaign down its sides for a VIP publicity party to unveil their new sparking wine by Taittinger. Before the build, the team samples the wine, learning bottle sabering, and tours the vineyard in a hot air balloon.
7	"Tribal New Zealand"	July 17, 2011
The team travels to New Zealand to create a historical sand sculpture the represents the Māori way of life for the "Matariki" (Māori New Year) festival. But in order to get the sculpture approved they must meet with the local tribal elders of Whareroa Marae village to ask for permission to build. Rusty gets a traditional Maori tattoo and the team participates in the Haka warrior dance.
8	"Renaissance Faire California"	July 23, 2011
The team heads to Irwindale, California for the Original Renaissance Pleasure Faire to build a grand sand castle to celebrate its 50th anniversary. The sky-high sculpture features two huge castles, a maiden, a knight with a battle axe battling a giant dragon that breathes smoke, and the Tudor rose insignia of Queen Elizabeth I.
9	"Thailand Water Festival"	July 31, 2011
The team visit Patong Beach in Phuket, Thailand, to build a splashy sand sculpture featuring a temple, lotus flowers, giant praying hands, an elephant shooting water from its trunk, and motion-detected sprinklers all celebrating the Songkran water festival of the Thai New Year. They also participate in a massive city-wide water fight and help paint murals in a Buddhist temple.
10	"Carnival Puerto Rico"	August 7, 2011
The team visits Ponce, Puerto Rico to create a massive sand sculpture that features the city's traditions: their flag, lion, landmark firehouse, Parque de Bombas (built in 1883), burying the sardine (to signal end of Carnival), and vejigante (traditional Carnival character that resembles a demon clown) in the Plaza Las Delicias to celebrate the annual Ponce Carnival. They also visit a local mask maker who has been designing masks for generations, but while there Andy gets sick and goes to the hospital for dehydration.
11	"Boeing Rocket Launch"	August 14, 2011
The team heads to Santa Ana, California to build a launch pad sand sculpture for the Discovery Science Center annual soda bottle Boeing rocket-launch event for children. The sculpture features a giant 12-foot rocket launching in front of a massive Moon, mission control, and company logo.
12	"Aquarium of the Pacific"	August 21, 2011
The team outdoes themselves when they design a hollow aquarium sand sculpture for the Aquarium of the Pacific in Long Beach, California to help launch their new exhibit Ocean Science Center, a big world globe. They invite a new sculptor to help out and he defies gravity with his hollowed-out 9-foot-tall giant jellyfish. Rusty and Sue go scuba diving with all the fish in one of the tanks while the rest of the team play with sea lions and sea otters and swim with sand sharks.
13	"Surprise Marriage Proposal"	August 28, 2011
The team heads to Huntington Beach, California, Surf City U.S.A, for a project they never attempted before. Tim, a local surfer, is about to propose to his unexpecting girlfriend Jessica. They must create a romantic sand sculpture surprise for the anniversary of their first date at the beach. First they get to know all about Jessica when she is tricked into thinking she's a surf-model for the sculpture. It features the Huntington Beach Pier where they had their first date, Orcas, Jessica's favorite animal (Chris is called-in once again to creates them) which morphs into a bouquet of roses, luggage that shows all the place they've been together, and a huge wave with Jessica surfing and Tim kneeling on the front of her surfboard proposing.
14	"Crayola Experience"	September 4, 2011
The team visits the world-famous Crayola factory in Easton, Pennsylvania, to build an imaginative kid-friendly sand sculpture to commemorate the 15th anniversary of the Discovery Center. They get a tour of the factory where 14 million crayons are made per day, get a sneak peek at the top-secret laboratory where colors the public hasn't seen yet are created, and play with colored sand, which they include in their sculpture. It features a giant Crayola box spilling out huge crayons, kid drawing and painting on an easel, and a birthday cake with crayon candles in celebration of the big day.
15	"Times Square Fleet Week"	September 11, 2011
The team is in the middle of it all when they're hired by the U.S. Navy to build a massive sand sculpture in the center of Times Square to honor New York City's Fleet Week and celebrate the centennial (100-year anniversary) of American Naval Aviation. The team gets a bird-eye view of the city as they fly in a helicopter to check out the different aircraft on board the U.S.S. Iwo Jima. The sculpture features: an American flag as the backdrop, an Osprey airplane, a Harrier jump jet, and a Sea Dragon helicopter flying out of it. Three military figures from the Navy, the Marines, and the Coast Guard, and a soldier reunited with his family—all meeting the Admiral's approval.
16	"Noah's Ark"	September 18, 2011
The team heads to Noah's Ark Waterpark in Wisconsin Dells, Wisconsin to build the largest hollow sand sculpture ever attempted to promote the park's outrageous thrill rides, Black Anaconda and Scorpion's Tail. There's a contest to decide which one of these water slides is the favorite, but first they decide for themselves by taking a ride on them.

=== Season 2 (2012) ===
No.	Title	Original release date
17	"Fantasy Fest"	April 5, 2012
In the season two opener, the team builds an aquatic-themed sculpture for the annual "Fantasy Fest Parade" that begins in Old Town and ends at the Ibis Bay Resort in Key West, Florida. However, their masterpiece is actually a target for Professor Splash, a world-famous, high-diving stuntman who will dive off a 30-foot tower into pool of water only 12 inches deep. The design features mermaids, an octopus, and themselves disguised as partygoers judging the performance. But they must complete their sculpture fast before approaching Tropical Storm Rina threatens to wipe out all their hard work.
18	"Las Vegas Rodeo Party"	April 5, 2012
The sculptors are hired by bull riding champion Gary Leffew to build a cowboy-themed sand sculpture to celebrate the National Finals Rodeo in Las Vegas, Nevada. They must work amid the chaos in the center of Sin City's historic Fremont Street while dealing with wet sand and overnight intoxicated vandals who try to ruin their design, which includes a smoking mechanical bull, a cowgirl, poker chips, a craps table and a "barrel man" (rodeo clown).
19	"San Diego Safari"	April 12, 2012
The team travels to San Diego, California to build a huge sand sculpture featuring various zoo animals and speed for their new attraction, the "Cheetah Run" at the San Diego Zoo Safari Park. They spend time with giraffes, hand-feed rhinos, and race against a cheetah to get inspiration before finalizing their design, which also includes an elephant, a lion, a zebra, a macaw and a fossa.
20	"Sarasota Muscle Boats"	April 19, 2012
Muscle boat racer Diamond Dave Branch hires the team to celebrate his soon-to-be victory in a muscle boat race in his hometown of Sarasota, Florida. He races against his good friend and arch nemesis, "The Hammer" and his boat "Twisted Metal". However, the surprise sculpture which features The Hammer's boat complete with an engine that blends margaritas and a sexy bikini-clad woman on the bow is actually celebrating their 20-year friendship in muscle boat racing.
21	"Lord of the Wind"	April 26, 2012
The team is hired to build a Mexican-inspired, wind-theme sand sculpture winners podium for a big windsurfing and kite-boarding competition called the "Lord of Wind" in Baja, Mexico. But in order to get it done on time, they have to deal with severe winds, brittle sand and a creative dispute. Their masterpiece features a Day of the Dead wind surfer and kite boarder skeletons, a wind turbine, Aztec ruins, and the Mexican god of wind, Quetzalcoatl.
22	"The Firewalkers of Fiji"	May 3, 2012
The sculptors travel to beautiful Fiji to build an elaborate sand sculpture for a fire-walking ceremony celebrating the 65th anniversary of the famous Outrigger Resort, a place that prides itself in preserving Fijian history. The team learns about how the warriors used to eat their enemies in the Cannibal Caves, which is incorporated into their final design. The sculpture also includes an outrigger canoe, a tribal leader, a cannibal mask and a giant bonfire pit. But in order to complete their masterpiece, they must get through all the surprise tropical downpours.
23	"South Pacific Sharks "	May 13, 2012
The sand sculptures travel to Palau to design a shark-themed functioning bar made entirely from sand to celebrate the 10th anniversary of the country's renowned shark sanctuary. However, they have to overcome heavy rain, coarse sand, and a devastating collapse that threatens to ruin their nearly finished sand sculpture.
24	"Kona Brewfest"	May 20, 2012
The team travels to Kona, Hawaii on the Big Island to build a giant beer-themed sand sculpture for the annual Kona Brewing Co. "Beer Fest". Their design features an erupting sand volcano with Madame Pele's face, a massive gecko (the company's mascot), an emu pig, and a working beer tap that's kept ice cold.
25	"World's Strongest Man"	June 3, 2012
The team designs a giant sand sculpture for professional strongman, Scott Brengel at the California's Strongest Man competition, a sister World's Strongest Man event in Huntington Beach, California. Their piece of sand art features a massive muscle-flexing strongman, four stand-alone sculptures that the competitors carry 40 feet to place on a platform carved out of sand.
26	"Monster Jam Truck Showdown"	June 10, 2012
The teams builds a "hellish" sand sculpture for the Monster Jam World Finals in Las Vegas, Nevada to honor the 30th anniversary of the monster truck, Grave Digger, and its creator, Dennis Anderson. Their design features a sand version of the truck being dragged down to hell by the grim reaper with lost souls watching while a tombstone rests in peace on a blood icing cake. Also, Monster Jam's "Pyro Dave" incorporates pyrotechnics into the masterpiece.
27	"West Coast Warrior Dash"	June 20, 2012
The team travels to Lake Elsinore in Riverside County, California to design a viking-themed sand sculpture that serves as an obstacle for runners in the Southern California Warrior Dash, a mud-crawling, fire-leaping 5k run with extreme obstacles. The "mud-runners" must get through the team's viking ship masterpiece, complete with a dragon, scary characters in the "pit of despair" and lastly, scale the face of Oden to the finish line.
28	"Machine Gun Mayhem"	June 27, 2012
The team designs a sand sculpture that features a shooting gallery of zombies, aliens, bombs, bulls eyes, and a huge hand grenade that will explode on impact. All this will be used as a massive target for rapid-fire weapon enthusiasts at the annual Southern Ohio Machine Gun Shoot hosted by the owner of the Lock, Stock & Barrel Gunshop near the town of Portsmouth, Ohio.
29	"Daytona 500"	July 8, 2012
The team is hired by two-time racecar champion Michael Waltrip to design a surprise race-inspired sand sculpture honoring his older brother Darrel Waltrip's induction into the NASCAR Hall of Fame. But they have to build their sculpture on the noisy and chaotic day of the Daytona 500 in Daytona Beach, Florida. Their masterpiece features a statue of Darrel doing his winning shuffle and his number 17 Tide racecar racing down a banked track.
