= Ponce Marathon =

Long-distance running event held every year in Ponce, Puerto Rico

- Date: December, usually around the 12th
- Location: Ponce, Puerto Rico
- Event type: Road
- Distance: Marathon
- Primary sponsor: Ponce Municipal Government
- Beneficiary: Federación de Atletismo de Puerto Rico
- Established: 1949 (unofficially), 77 years ago 1970 (officially), 56 years ago
- Course records: Men's: 2:15:35 (1982); Jorge "Peco" González; Women's: 2:51:54 (2021); Beverly Ramos Morales
- Participants: Some 150 athletes Attendees: Over 10,000

The Ponce Marathon (Spanish: Maratón La Guadalupe de Ponce) is a long-distance running event held every year in Ponce, Puerto Rico. Established in 1970, (Note: Some historians, such as Carmelo Rosario Natal, state that official records mention this marathon at least as early as 1965. See Carmelo Rosario Natal, Ponce En Su Historia Moderna: 1945–2002, Published by Secretaría de Cultura y Turismo of the Government of the Autonomous Municipality of Ponce. (Ponce, Puerto Rico) 2003. p. 89.) it is the only Olympic marathon held in Puerto Rico.

The race has a length of 42.195 kilometers (26.219 miles) and takes place on a Sunday during the month of December. It starts at 5AM, and runs from the intersection of PR-12 and PR-14 to Parque de Bombas. It is managed by Secretaría de Recreación y Deportes (Secretariat of Recreation and Sports) of the municipality of Ponce. It is certified by Logistik Event Management, "the same organization that certifies the Boston Marathon."

The 40th edition of the marathon in 2010 was attended by over 10,000 people. Some 150 athletes participated in the event in 2013; by 2024 the number of participants was above 250. In 2010, the event received an award from the Federación de Atletismo de Puerto Rico (Puerto Rico Athletic Federation) as the best athletic running event in Puerto Rico; it had attained a perfect 100-point score in all evaluation areas. The 53rd edition in 2024, had room for up to 500 runners, of which over 250 had already registered some three weeks in advance.

Up to, and including, the 2006 edition, the event was a males-only run. Starting with the 2007 edition, it was officially open to both athletes from sexes.

== Overview ==
In addition to being the only one of the international marathons run over the distance of 42.195 kilometers and the national marathon of Puerto Rico, the marathon is the qualifying race for the Central American and Caribbean Games.

In addition to medals, Marathon organizers award cash prizes to winners, in both men and women categories, exceeding USD$30K. First place winners receive a $2,000 cash prize. The next five follow-up winners receive $1,000, $500, $400, $200 and $80 respectively. The Marathon also awards prizes to winners, both men and women, in these nine age categories: 20–24, 25–29, 30–34, 35–39, 40–44, 45–49, 50–54, 55–59 and 60+. First, second and third-place winners in each of these categories receive $80, $50 and $25 prizes, respectively. Unlike other marathons, registration for La Guadalupe is free; registration generally takes place the day before the event (Saturday) at Parque de Bombas. The $2,000 cash prize is the highest cash prize paid out for any running event in Puerto Rico.

== Route ==
The race starts at 5:00 am at PR-12 (Avenida Santiago de los Caballeros) at the intersection with PR-14 (Avenida Tito Castro/Avenida Betances) and heads south towards La Guancha. It makes 3 round trips on Avenida Santiago de los Caballeros and, on the fourth round, it then detours onto Avenida Las Americas (PR-163) heading west towards PR-123 (Avenida Hostos). At Avenida Hostos it turns right onto Calle Marina and heads north towards Plaza Las Delicias. The finish line will be at Calle Marina intersection with Calle Cristina, that is, right in front of Parque de Bombas in downtown Ponce. The race coincides with the Fiestas patronales de Ponce celebration. The 50th edition (2021) introduced a new route.

== Results ==
=== 1972 (3rd edition) ===
Category	Position	Winner	Origin	Timing	Ref
Men's Division	1	Mario Irizarry	Unknown	Unknown	

=== 1982 (13th edition) ===
Category	Position	Winner	Origin	Timing	Ref
Men's Division	1	Jorge Luis "Peco" González	Utuado	2:15:35	

=== 1983 (14th edition) ===
The event took place on 11 December.

Category	Position	Winner	Origin	Timing	Ref
Men's Division	1	César Mercado	Unknown	2:17:32	

=== 1985 (16th edition) ===
Category	Position	Winner	Origin	Timing	Ref
Men's Division	1	Eduardo Maldonado	Unknown	2:17:42	

=== 1986 (17th edition) ===
Category	Position	Winner	Origin	Timing	Ref
Men's Division	1	Eduardo Maldonado	Unknown	2:15:48	

=== 1988 (19th edition) ===
Category	Position	Winner	Origin	Timing	Ref
Men's Division	1	Luis E. Torres	Unknown	2:17:22	
	2	Eduardo Maldonado	Unknown	2:17:46	

=== 1991 (22nd edition) ===
Category	Position	Winner	Origin	Timing	Ref
Men's Division	1	César Mercado	Unknown	Unknown	

=== 1992 (23rd edition) ===
Category	Position	Winner	Origin	Timing	Ref
Men's Division	1	César Mercado	Unknown	Unknown	

=== 1993 (Canceled) ===
The event was cancelled due to scheduling conflict with the concurrent event of the Puerto Rico 1993 Central American and Caribbean Games celebrated this year in Ponce.

=== 1994 (24th edition) ===
Category	Position	Winner	Origin	Timing	Ref
Men's Division	1	César Mercado	Unknown	Unknown	

=== 2002 (32nd edition) ===
Category	Position	Winner	Origin	Timing	Ref
Men's Division	1	César Mercado	Unknown	Unknown	

=== 2003 (33rd edition) ===
Category	Position	Winner	Origin	Timing	Ref
Men's Division	1	César Mercado	Unknown	Unknown	

=== 2004 (34th edition) ===
Category	Position	Winner	Origin	Timing	Ref
Men's Division	1	César Mercado	Unknown	Unknown	

=== 2006 (36th edition) ===
The event took place on 10 December.

Category	Position	Winner	Origin	Timing	Ref
Men's Division	1	Luis Rivera	Aibonito	2:24:08	
	2	Máximo Oliveras	Toa Alta	2:36:49	
	3	José Rodríguez	Canóvanas	2:37:42	
Women's Division	1	Yolanda Mercado	Bayamón	2:52:51 (Note: Resultados P.R. reports this time as 2:54:47)	
	2	Maribel Burgos	Carolina	3:04:01	
	3	Mónica Larson	Arecibo	3:21:51	

=== 2007 (37th edition) ===
Prior to this year the marathon was essentially a men's-only event. Women could run it but they were not awarded prizes. Starting with the 2007 marathon, women runners were officially registered as competing runners and awarded prizes the same as men.

Category	Position	Winner	Origin	Timing	Ref
Men's Division	1	Máximo Oliveras	Corozal	Unknown	
Women's Division	1	Luz E. Torres	Guayanilla	Unknown	

=== 2008 (38th edition) ===
The event took place on 14 December.

Category	Position	Winner	Origin	Timing	Ref
Men's Division	1	Luis Rivera	Aibonito	2:28.19	
	2	Miguel Solivan	Aibonito	2:31.21	
	3	César Mercado	Maricao	2:38.06	
Women's Division	1	Irmalyn Falcón	Toa Baja	2:58:03	
	2	Yolanda Mercado	Bayamón	3:02.30	
	3	Sara Mary González	Unknown	3:09.55	

=== 2009 (39th edition) ===
The event, which ordinarily takes place on a Sunday, this year took place on a Saturday (12 December). The goal was to have it coincide with Las Mañanitas to maximize the attendance to the Marathon. This year there was also a change to the route of the event.

Category	Position	Winner	Origin	Timing	Ref
Men's Division	1	Miguel Solivan	–	2:24:25	

=== 2010 (40th edition) ===
The event took place on 12 December.

Category	Position	Winner	Origin	Timing	Ref
Men's Division	1	Luis Rivera	Aibonito	2:22:47	
	2	Nelson Rodríguez	Utuado	2:23.32	
	3	Eliezer Robles	Lares	2:25.45	
Women's Division	1A	Yolanda Mercado	Bayamón	2:56:26	
	1B	Yolanda Mercado	Bayamón	2:54:47	
	2	Erica Méndez	San Germán	3:17:27	
	3	María Beltrán	Bayamón	3:17.48	

=== 2011 (41st edition) ===
The event took place on Sunday 11 December.

Category	Position	Winner	Origin	Timing	Ref
Men's Division	1	Eliezer Robles	Lares	2:31:09	
	2	Jesús Morales	Villalba	2:34:20	
	3	Nelson Rodríguez	Utuado	2:36:22	
Women's Division	1	Yolanda Mercado	Bayamón	2:57:23	
	2	María E. Beltrán	Bayamón	3:20:03	
	3	Liria García	San Juan	2:20:42	

=== 2012 (42nd edition) ===
The event took place on 9 December.

Category	Position	Winner	Origin	Timing	Ref
Men's Division	1	Eliezer Robles	Lares	2:22.38	
Women's Division	1	Angélica Torres	Unknown	Unknown	

=== 2013 (43rd edition) ===
The event took place on Sunday 8 December.

Category	Position	Winner	Origin	Timing	Ref
Men's Division	1	Miguel Solivan	Aibonito	2:26:38:09	
Women's Division	1	Patricia Lázaro	Guaynabo	3:09:47:58	

=== 2015 (45th edition) ===
The event took place on Sunday 8 December.

Category	Position	Winner	Origin	Timing	Ref
Men's Division	1	Eliezer Robles	Lares	2:36:55	
Women's Division	1	Paola Rivera	Puerto Rico	3:01:13	

=== 2016 (46th edition) ===
The event took place on Sunday 18 December 2016.

Category	Position	Winner	Origin	Timing	Ref
Men's Division	1	Avery McCulloch	United States	2:29:12	AI
Women's Division	1	Beverly Ramos	Puerto Rico	2:57:51	AI

=== 2017 (47th edition) ===
The event was cancelled due to the 20 September Hurricane Maria. The event had been scheduled for 10 December 2017.

=== 2018 (48th edition) ===
The event took place on Sunday 9 December.

Category	Position	Winner	Origin	Timing	Ref
Men's Division	1	Luis J. Rivera	Aibonito	2:38:34	
	2	Josué Javier Ortiz	Utuado	2:42:20	
	3	Rafael Hernández	Vega Baja	2:46:35	
	4	Javier Torres	Aibonito	2:51:17	
	5	Juan Pérez	Morovis	2:56:16	
	6	Somelins Delgado	Trujillo Alto	2:57:04	
Women's Division	1	Karla M. Sanyet	Ponce	3:25:34 (Note: El Sol de Puerto Rico reports this time as 3:25:08)	
	2	Karla Espada	Utuado	3:30:30	
	3	Blanca N. Ocasio	Ponce	3:57:35	
	4	Moraima Cancel	San Sebastián	4:06:26	
	5	Damaris Mendoza	Caguas	4:31:49	
	6	Ilka Calvo	San Juan	4:42:55	

5K Run

Category	Position	Winner	Origin	Timing	Ref
Men's Division	1	José M. González	Jayuya	16.15	
	2	Juan Villafaña	Ponce	17:25	
	3	Damián Guadalupe	Sabana Grande	17:43	
Women's Division	1	Mariedalys Ortiz	Aibonito	19:29	
	2	Karla Espada	Villalba	19:39	
	3	Blanca N. Ocasio	Peñuelas	20:37	

=== 2019 (49th edition) ===
The event took place on Sunday 15 December.

Category	Position	Winner	Origin	Timing	Ref
Men's Division	1	Ramón Alicea	Ponce	2:32:57	
	2	Josué Ortiz	Utuado	2:40:00	
	3	Nelson Rodríguez	Utuado	2:42:00	
Women's Division	1	Yadira Rosario	Cidra	3:18:37	
	2	Jocelyn Cordero	Ponce	3:20:40	
	3	Rebeca Dávila	Unknown	3:29:32	

==== 5K Run ====
Category	Position	Winner	Origin	Timing	Ref
Men's Division	1	José González	Jayuya	15:42	
	2	Ángel Cruz	Aibonito	16:25	
	3	Erwin Rey	Vega Baja	17:54	
Women's Division	1	Alexandra Rodríguez	Santa Isabel	20:16	
	2	Crystal Correo	Unknown	20:47	
	3	Manedalis Ortiz	Unknown	21:04	

=== 2020 (Canceled) ===
The event was canceled due to the COVID-19 pandemic in Puerto Rico.

=== 2021 (50th edition) ===
The event took place on Sunday, 12 December. Beverly Ramos Morales set a new record in the women's division.

Category	Position	Winner	Origin	Timing	Ref
Men's Division	1	Alexander Torres Rojas	Orocovis	2:32:32	
Women's Division	1	Beverly Ramos Morales	Trujillo Alto	2:51:54	
Wheelchair	1	Jeffrey Kennedy	Rio Grande	Unknown	

=== 2022 (51st edition) ===
The event was scheduled for 11 December 2022.

=== 2023 (52nd edition) ===
The event was scheduled for 17 December 2023. Due to a technical organizational error, runners ran a longer distance than the 42.195 kilometers required, and the Organizing Committee made changes so the error would not occur again; those changes were implemented the following year for the 53rd edition of the marathon.

Category	Position	Winner	Origin	Timing	Ref
Men's Division	1	Albertna Tene	Kenya	2:25:30	AI
Women's Division	1	María Ramos	Puerto Rico	3:05:12	AI

=== 2024 (53rd edition) ===
The event was scheduled for 15 December 2024. A runner-wearable chip was introduced this year that would make its recording of the runner's finish time the official mark for the runner. Each runner is outfitted with such chip

=== 2025 (54th edition) ===
The event took place on Sunday, 14 December 2025.

Category	Position	Winner	Origin	Timing	Ref
Men's Division (Insular)	1	Alexander Torres Rojas	Orocovis	2:31:29	
	2	Rafael Hernández	Vega Baja	2:42:35	
	3	Bryan Ramos	Cabo Rojo	2:53:25	
Women's Division (International)	1	María García Domínguez	Spain	3:03:09	
Women's Division (Insular)	1	Karla Sanyet	Ponce	3:08:16	
	2	Karol Martínez	Ponce	3:48:54	
	3	Jennifer Vázquez	Naranjito	3:53:32	
Wheelchair	1	Bernardino Ruiz	Unknown	2:45:27	
