= Ponce City Hall =

Historic government building in Puerto Rico

- Casa Alcaldía de Ponce – City Hall
- U.S. National Register of Historic Places
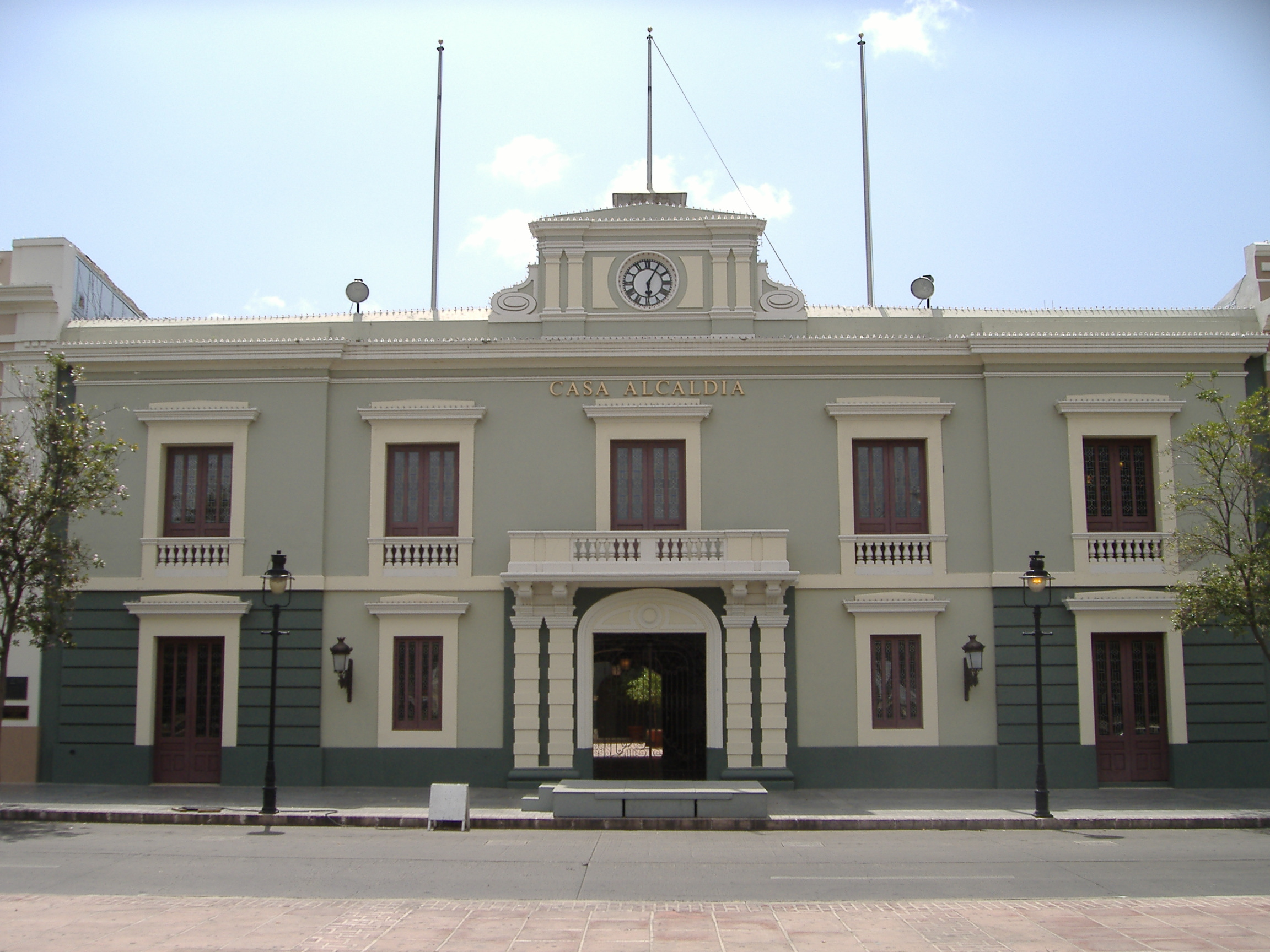
- Casa Alcaldía de Ponce

- Location within Puerto Rico
- Location: Calle Degetau, Ponce, Puerto Rico
- Coordinates: 18°00′39″N 66°36′50″W
- Area: less than one acre
- Built: 1840
- Architect: Francisco Gil Capó
- Architectural style: Neoclásico Isabelino
- MPS: 19th Century Civil Architecture in Ponce TR (AD)
- NRHP reference No.: 86003197
- Added to NRHP: 19 November 1986

The Ponce City Hall (Spanish: Casa Alcaldía de Ponce) is a historic city hall in Ponce, Puerto Rico. It is located it the center of the city, on Calle Degetau, across from Plaza Degetau in the Ponce Historic Zone. The building serves as the seat of the executive branch of government of the Autonomous Municipality of Ponce, including the office of the mayor of Ponce. Built in 1840, it is the oldest colonial building in the city. The building was listed on the U.S. National Register of Historic Places in 1986 as Casa Alcaldía de Ponce-City Hall.

== History ==
The Ponce City Hall has one of the most unusual histories of any city hall throughout the world, because it was a jail until the end of the 19th century. Rooms currently used as offices were jail cells before, and the courtyard of the City Hall was the place where executions took place. The last public hanging on the island happened in its courtyard. It has been visited by four U.S. presidents, and three of them actually gave a speech from the City Hall's front balcony: Theodore Roosevelt, Herbert Hoover, and Franklin Roosevelt. George H. W. Bush visited, as well.

== Design and construction ==
Construction of the building started in 1844 and was completed in 1847. Engineering and architectural design for the building was directed by Francisco Gil Capó under the oversight of Mayor Salvador de Vives. The facade is said to be constructed of "simple but elegant lines." Its large front facade clock was acquired in England in 1877 at the time the city was given its city charter by Queen Isabel II of Spain. The interior has two courtyards designed in the typical architecture of the time and a spacious stairway leads to the main hall of the Municipal Legislature and the office of the mayor.

== Significance ==
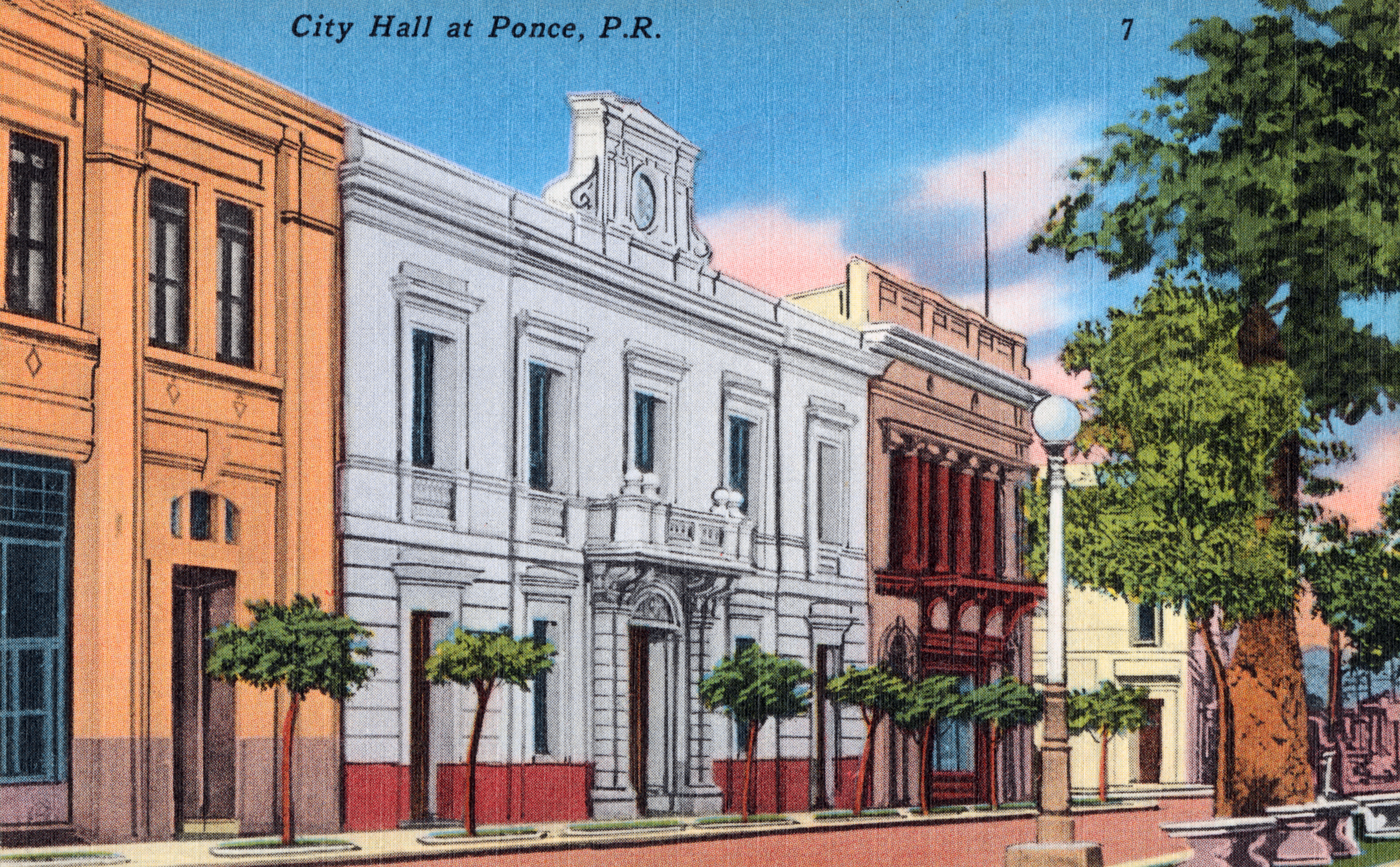
Photomechanical print (1954)

By 1848, the population of the Spanish settlement at Ponce had grown sufficiently to merit recognition as a city by Queen Isabel II. The construction of the City Hall coincides with this decree, thus qualifying the building as a landmark to the founding of Ponce.

As the first governmental structure in the city, the building incorporates elements designed to display its authoritative role. In fact, the design is contemporary to the 1848 addition to the Royal Palace (La Fortaleza) in San Juan and displays defensive, military characteristics, such as the buttressed street wall, similar to those of the Fortaleza. Most importantly, the vocabulary utilized is purely the Neoclassical Isabelino of the Spanish 19th century, representative of the works performed by the Royal Corps of Engineers of Spain and satisfying the demands of the growing aristocratic population of Ponce.

According to the Laws of the Indies, established in the 16th century to regulate the colonization of towns in the Americas, a settlement was to be planned around a central plaza, with the Holy Catholic church facing westward and the town hall or "Cabildo" (seat of government power) either opposite or adjacent, emphasizing the major and joint role of the church and state in Hispanic society. Located at the southern fringe of the plaza, at the center of the block between Calle Marina and Calle Cristina, the City Hall dominates the street wall between buildings of similar character and demonstrates faithfully the Spanish concept of the urban plaza. Although the interior has been altered during the 20th century in response to the growing needs of the municipal government, the exterior has maintained its individual and contextual integrity. Along with the Catedral de Nuestra Senora de la Guadalupe in the town plaza, the Ponce City Hall forms an essential element of the urban concept of plaza in Ponce, a Spanish colonial town flourishing during the 19th century.

== Physical appearance ==
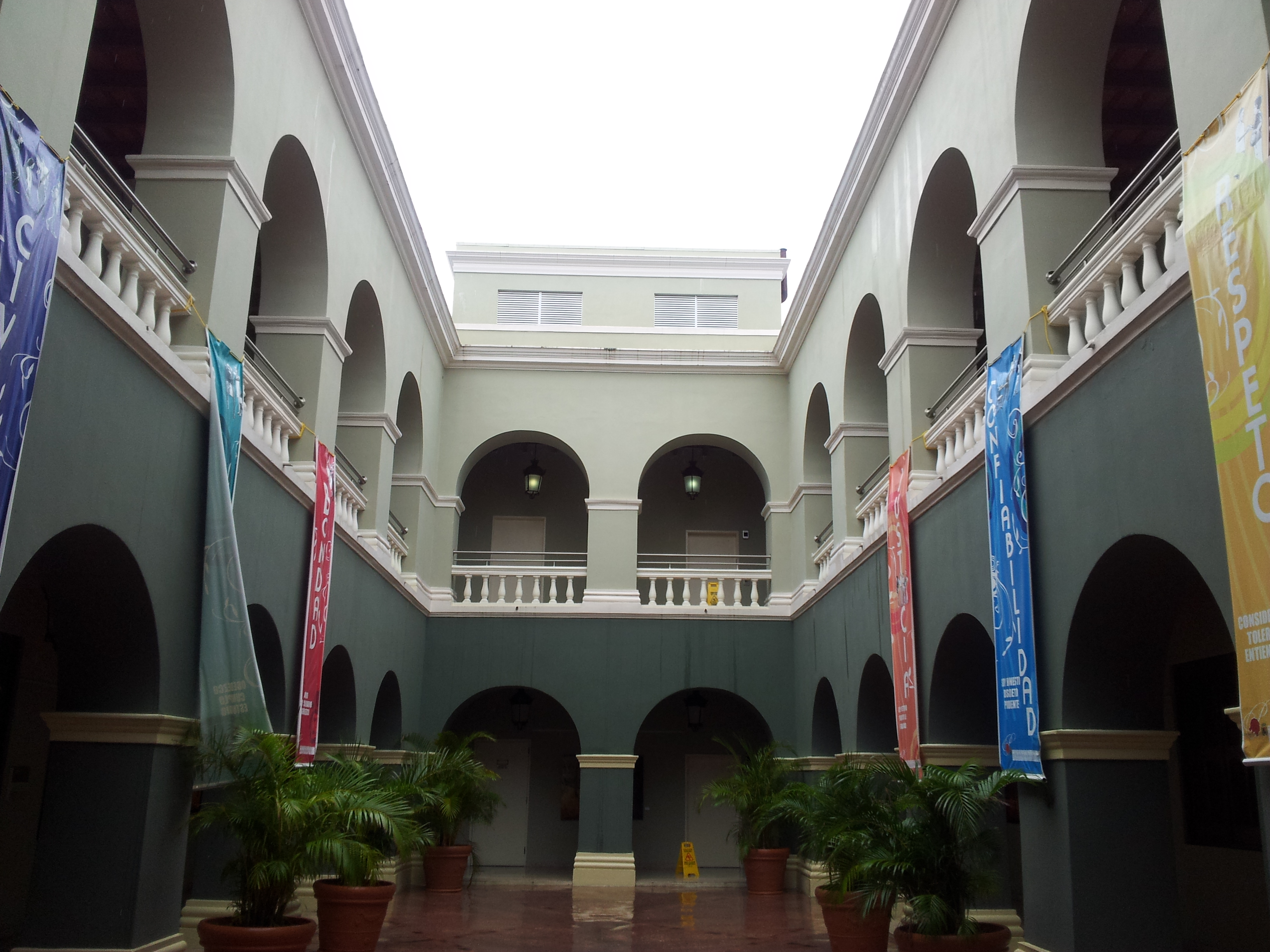
Main courtyard

The building is an attached, plastered masonry structure at the south side of the Plaza Degetau, occupying a lot at the center of the block between Calle Marina and Calle Cristina. The building's neoclassical austerity and strong symmetrical character are typical of 19th-century Spanish civil architecture.

The main facade consists of two stories, divided into five bays: a three bay central section flanked by and only slightly projecting single-bay section on either side. At the ground level, a very distinctive feature of the City Hall is the continuous, projecting water table which creates the appearance of a fortification wall. The central entrance consists of a wide rectangular void, framed by an elliptical archivolt molding. This composition is emphasized by a frontispiece consisting of flanking pairs of banded pilasters supporting decorative brackets which, in turn, support a balustered balcony accessed through the second level. The single bay sections have smooth rustication only at the ground floor, terminating at a continuous string course which divides this level from the upper.

All openings other than the main entrance and the second and fourth bays at ground level are articulated with full-height, wooden, double doors with louvre panels. The central entrance houses decorative, wrought-iron railings and its flanking windows begin at a height of approximately four feet. At the upper level bays, baluster rails create balconettes. Planar surrounds frame the window openings, extending above to incorporate separate architrave moldings.

A continuous cornice and parapet extend across the facade. A pedimented frontispiece composed of a clock, flanked by pairs of small pairs of Tuscan pilasters, capped by an entablature and supported at either side by a scroll element emphasizes the central bay above the running cornice. In addition, a weathervane rises up above the pediment, further strengthening the symmetrical quality of the facade.

== Uses ==
In addition to government offices, the Ponce City Hall today is the common departing location for a number of other activities and events, including the famous annual Ponce Carnival.

== Location ==
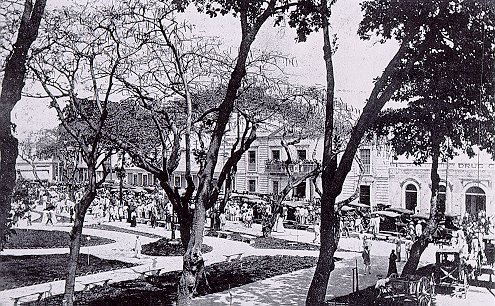
Plaza Degetau (1900, then called Plaza Real)

It fronts onto the Plaza Las Delicias, the town square of Ponce, which contains the historic Parque de Bombas and the Ponce Cathedral. The street it is on is called Calle Degetau.

In 1986 the property was bounded to the North, 27.16 meters long, by Villa and Comercio streets; to the South, 27.10 meters long, by Luna Street; to the West, 75.00 meters long, by the properties of Moscoso Brothers and a lot owned by Mario Mercado Succession (Estate); and to the East, 79.10 meters long, by the properties Sanchez Frasquero Succession (Estate) and a lot owned by Ponce Municipal Government.

== Today ==
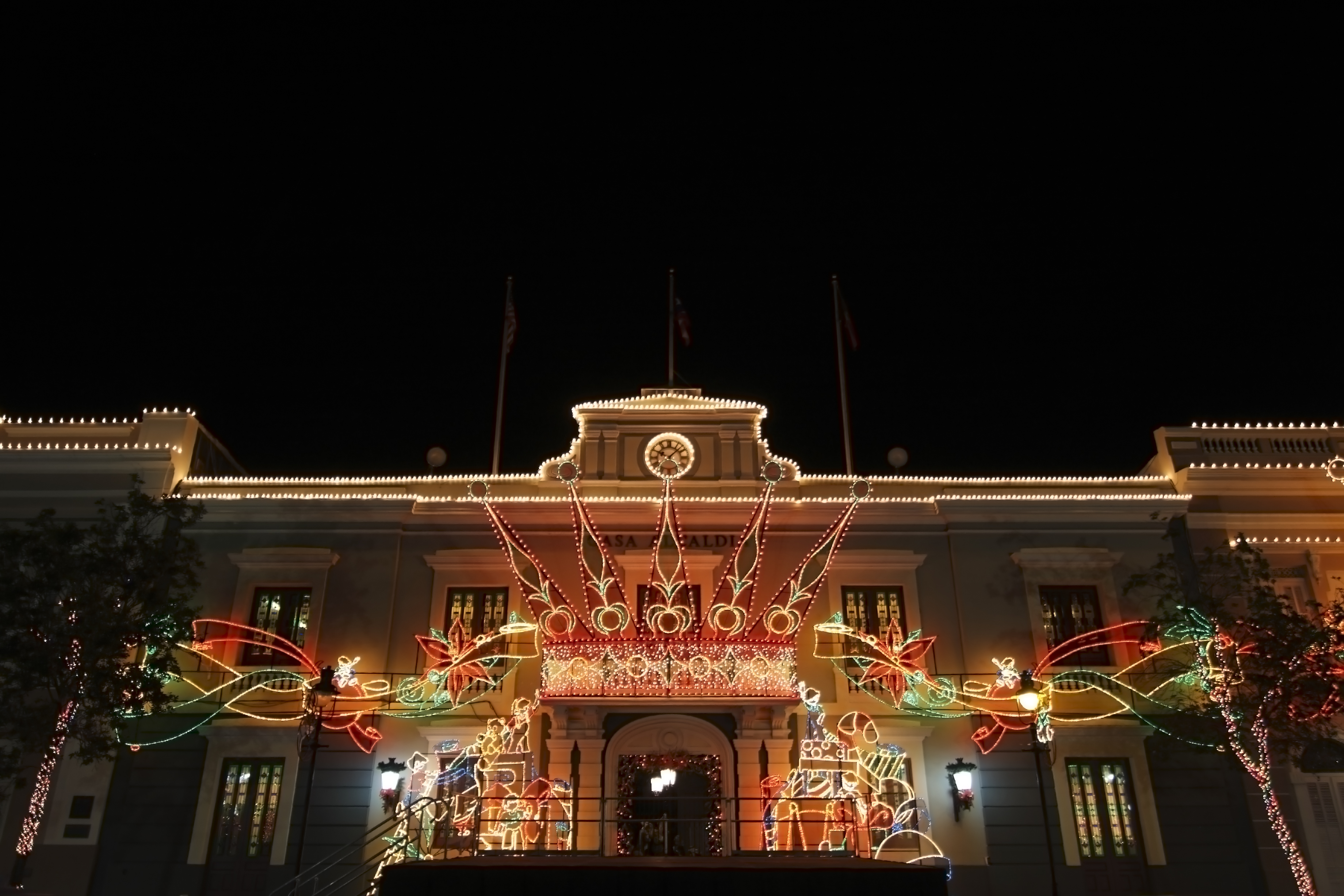
City hall during Christmas

In 1905 the Ponce City Hall stood above all other surrounding structures. Today's Ponce City Hall complex includes the adjacent buildings of Moscoso & Co. and El Cometa. The Legislature of the Autonomous Municipality of Ponce occupies the old El Cometa building which during the 20th century was home to one of Ponce's largest general stores. The Moscoso addition is used by executive offices of the mayor. The original city hall building is now (in 2010) bounded west by the old Moscoso building which has since been incorporated as Ponce Municipal Government offices, and bounded east by the former El Cometa building which has since also been incorporated by the Municipal Government to become the headquarters of the Legislature of the Autonomous Municipality of Ponce. Casa Alcaldia de Ponce holds a painting of Regent Queen of Spain María Cristina de Habsburgo-Lorena.

== See also ==
- National Register of Historic Places listings in southern Puerto Rico
