= Festival Nacional de la Quenepa =

Annual festival held in Ponce, Puerto Rico

Coordinates: 18°0′00″N 66°37′00″W

- Promotional poster for the 2010 Festival Nacional de la Quenepa
- Official name: Festival Nacional de la Quenepa
- Also called: Festival de la Quenepa
- Observed by: Puerto Ricans in Ponce, Puerto Rico
- Type: Local, cultural
- Significance: The city's official fruit
- Celebrations: Music, dancing, crafts, food
- Observances: Yearly
- Date: August or September
- Duration: 3 days
- Frequency: Annual
- First time: 2008
- Related to: Genip fruit

The Festival Nacional de la Quenepa (English: National Genip Fruit Festival) is a cultural celebration that takes place every year in Ponce, Puerto Rico. The festival centers around the genip fruit, the city's official fruit. The celebration lasts three days and takes place over a weekend (Friday through Sunday). It is generally held on the second weekend of August, but occasionally during a weekend in September. It is sponsored by the Oficina de Desarrollo Cultural (Office of Cultural Development) of the Ponce Municipal Government.

== History ==
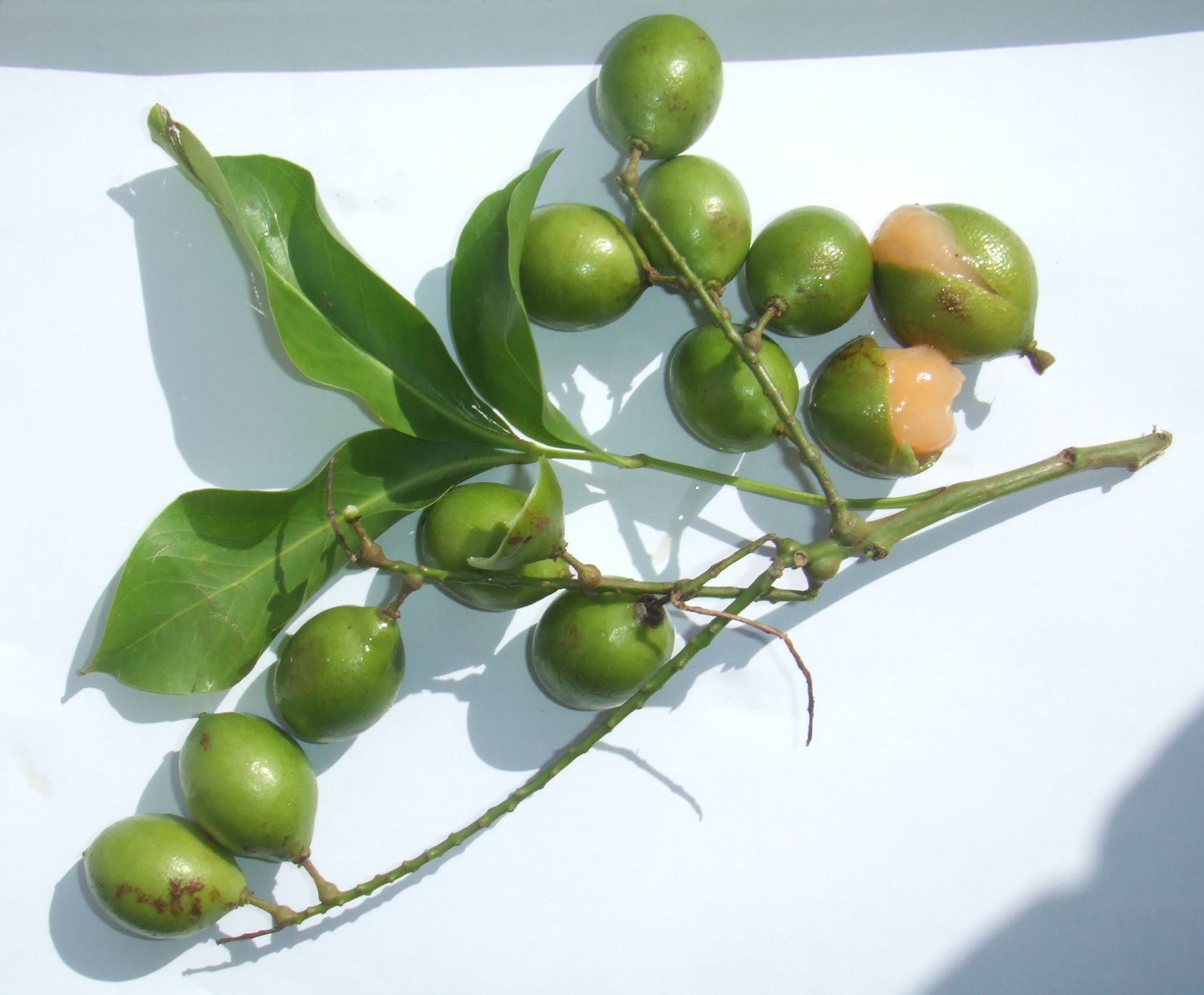
The juicy Quenepa fruit after which the traditional festival is held

The festival is one of the newest in the Puerto Rico. It was started in 2008. It was proposed in January 2008 by Jorge Fernández Torres, a municipal government employee, to the Municipal Government, who accepted and adopted the idea.

It takes place at Plaza Las Delicias, the city's central square. The festival takes place during August, but sometimes in September. The event has been held, at least once, at Parque Ecológico Urbano. Four varieties of quenepas are grown in Puerto Rico, with one of them named after the city of Ponce. The city of Ponce is known as La Ciudad de las Quenepas (Genip City), not because of any quenepa farms, but because the fruit is so commonly grown in city residents' backyards.

== Events ==
The festival includes arts and crafts, food, folkloric music, games, and plenty of farmers market quenepas. It also includes a competition for the most unusual quenepa-based dish. All the activities of the festival center on the genip fruit. As such, much of the foods, from cakes to juices, are based genip fruit recipes. Likewise, crafts are made, displayed and sold that are based on the seed of the genip fruit. The Second annual Festival de la Quenepa included cakes, custards, juices, jellies, frappes, and rice with quenepas, among others. It is organized as a family event, with activities for children, such as games, and clowns.

== See also ==
- Carnaval de Ponce
- Feria de Artesanías de Ponce
- Ponce Jazz Festival
- Fiesta Nacional de la Danza
- Día Mundial de Ponce
- Bienal de Arte de Ponce
- Las Mañanitas
- Festival de Bomba y Plena de San Antón
- Carnaval de Vejigantes
- Festival Nacional Afrocaribeño
