= Festival Nacional Afrocaribeño =

Annual celebration held in Ponce, Puerto Rico

Coordinates: 18°0′32.688″N 66°32′3.372″W

- Typical poster used to announce the Festival
- Official name: Festival Nacional Afrocaribeño de Puerto Rico
- Also called: Festival Afrocaribeño
- Type: Local, cultural
- Celebrations: Music, food, dancing, crafts, rides
- Date: Last weekend of June
- Frequency: Yearly
- First time: 1999

Festival Nacional Afrocaribeño (National Afro-Caribbean Festival) is an annual cultural celebration held at Ángel "Cuqui" Mangual baseball field in the La Cuarta neighborhood of Barrio Capitanejo in Ponce, Puerto Rico. The celebration, which commonly lasts three days, takes place in late June. It has been called "a world-class" event that brings together "the best exponents of salsa, bomba, plena and merengue music". It is attended by some 30,000 people. The festival's purpose is to positively impact the region by creating a cultural space to help preserve traditions. It aims to highlight the contributions to Puerto Rico culture and society by Puerto Ricans of African heritage. The festivities are highlighted by bands playing salsa, bomba and plena music.

== History ==
The festival was organized in the late 1990s to counter raising criminal activity in the community of La Cuarta, and to help improve the self-esteem of its residents. "From those humble beginnings" the community "is now a place that smells like tradition." The community of "La Cuarta" is located at the border between Ponce and Juana Diaz. It was founded in the early 20th century next to a sugar cane mill that is now extinct.

== Contents and purpose ==
Festival Nacional Afrocaribeño is organized and held by Comité Pro Nuestra Cultura. Its leader is Ángel 'Papote' Alvarado Aguilera. Over 20 artists participate during the event's three days' duration. The event's purpose is to promote the Afro-Puerto Rican and Afro-Caribbean roots of the Puerto Rican people while contributing to the educational and social of growth of the community. Another objective is to "break the social stigma that exists against underpriviledged communities."

Some of the musical groups that have participated in the past include Tommy Olivencia and his band, El Gran Combo, La Sonora Ponceña, Gilberto Santa Rosa, Victor Manuel, and Plena Libre.

== Finances and cost ==
The event is free to the public, but a voluntary donation of $1 is encouraged. The entity that organizes the event used to receive a contribution from the Ponce and Juana Diaz municipal governments but, as of 2017, such allowances were halted due to the financial crisis those governments were experiencing. The 2016, and last, contribution form the Ponce Municipal Government was 5% of the total cost of the event.

== List of events ==
A typical music lineup is as follows (this was the music lineup for the 2017 event):

Friday:

8:00 p.m.: Secreto a Voces
9:00 p.m.: Tego Calderón
11:00 pm.: Plenéalo

Saturday:

8:30 p.m.: Bomba Evolución
9:30 p.m.: Homenage to Giovanni Hidalgo y José Mañengue Hidalgo
10:00 p.m.: Grupo Esencia
11:00 p.m.: La Sonora Ponceña

Sunday:

4:00 p.m.: Isabel Albizu Bomba School
6:00 p.m.: Bomba IYA
7:00 p.m.: Homenage to La Cuarta's Past Musicians
7:30 p.m.: Guayacanes de San Antón
8:30 p.m.: Homenage to Ángel "Cholo" Espada
9:30 p.m.: Tommy Olivencia

External videos
- See the 2018 festival nacional afrocaribeño 2018 at La Cuarta, here

== See also ==
- Feria de Artesanías de Ponce
- Ponce Jazz Festival
- Fiesta Nacional de la Danza
- Día Mundial de Ponce
- Festival Nacional de la Quenepa
- Bienal de Arte de Ponce
- Festival de Bomba y Plena de San Antón
- Carnaval de Vejigantes
- Fiestas patronales de Ponce
