= Feria de Artesanías de Ponce =

Crafts fair in Ponce, Puerto Rico

Coordinates: 18°0′00″N 66°37′00″W

- The poster bill used for the 2018 Feria de Artesania
- Official name: Feria de Artesanías y Muestra de Arte de Ponce
- Observed by: Ponceños in Ponce, Puerto Rico
- Type: Local, cultural, musical
- Significance: Indigenous and native traditions
- Celebrations: Crafts, art, music, traditional foods
- Observances: Yearly
- Begins: Friday
- Ends: Sunday
- Date: Late March or early April
- Duration: 3 days
- Frequency: Annual
- Related to: Taino, Jibaro, Culture of Africa

The Feria de Artesanías de Ponce (English: Ponce Crafts Fair), formally, Feria de Artesanías y Muestra de Arte de Ponce (Ponce Crafts Fair and Arts Expo), is an event that takes place every year in Ponce, Puerto Rico, where artists, craftspeople and artisans showcase their products. The products showcased are traditionally hand-made and in small quantities. The fair centers around crafts that highlight the traditional cultural background of Puerto Rico, including Taino, African, and Spanish traditions. The event started in 1974 and is reported to draw "thousands of visitors". It lasts three days and is held over a weekend during the month of April.

== History ==
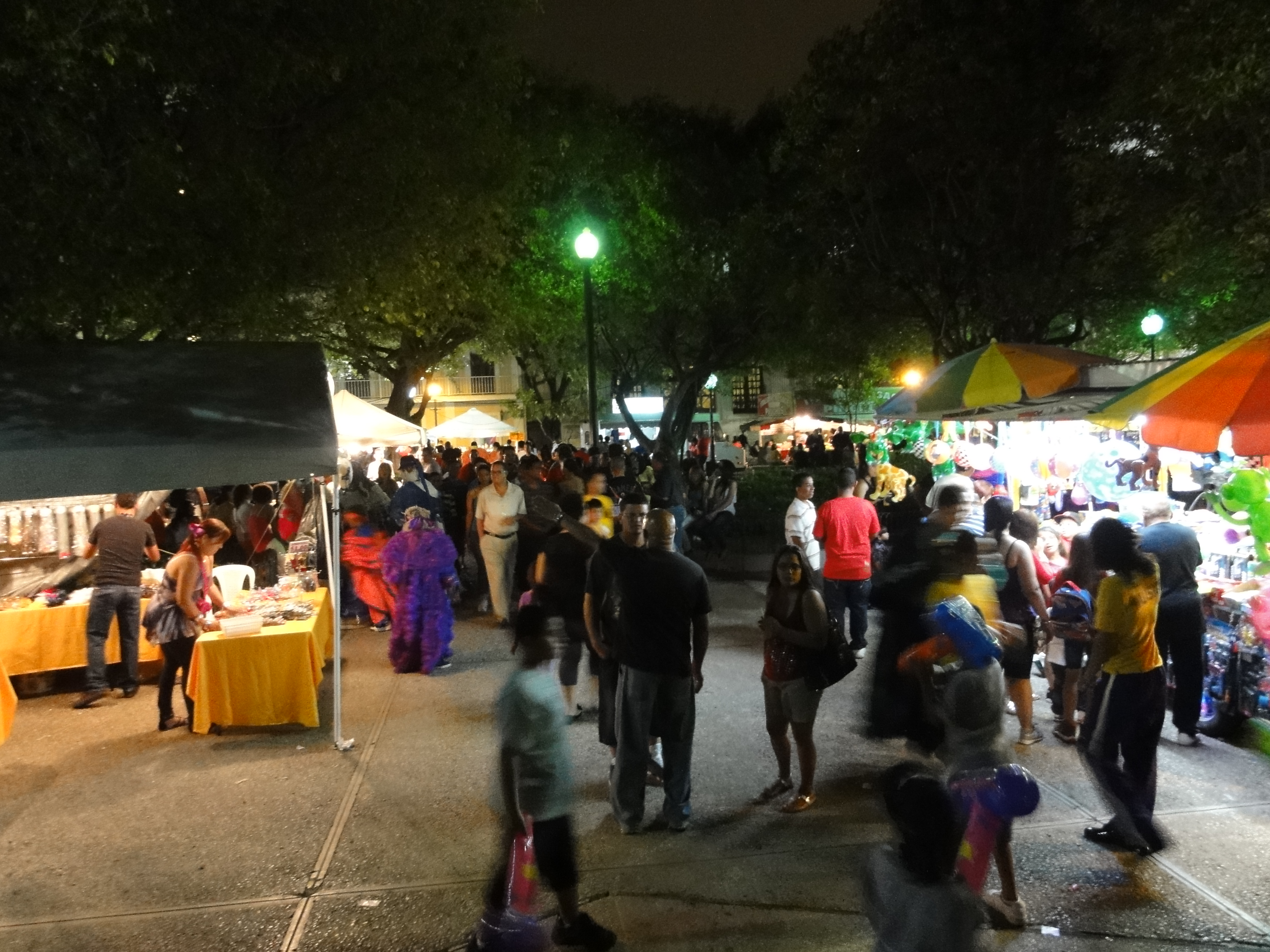
Feria de Artesanías de Ponce 2018, Plaza Las Delicias

Handcrafts and visual arts have a long cultural history in the city of Ponce. Some of its better known plastic artists are Miguel Pou, Librado Net, and Wichie Torres. Many Ponce Historic Zone homes were detailed by local craftsmen that worked alongside prominent Ponce architects in woodworking, ironworking, and metalworking. The Feria promotes Taíno, Jíbaro and African cultures. The Taino culture was strong in the Ponce region with Taino cacique Agueybana originating from this region, and the Tibes Indigenous Ceremonial Park being located in Ponce's Barrio Portugués. Taíno artifacts have also been found in Ponce's Caracoles sector. Ponce was also the Island's stronghold of African culture as African slaves were brought to the Ponce area in large quantities to work the sugar fields during the 19th century sugar cane rush; the only monument to the abolition of slavery in Puerto Rico and the entire Caribbean is located in Ponce. Feria de Artesanías de Ponce started in March 1974.

== Venue ==
The celebration lasts three days and takes place during the month of March, sometimes in April, at Plaza Degetau, in Plaza Las Delicias. It was started in 1974 and has been held continuously since. The 2020 edition was not celebrated due to the COVID-19 pandemic. This fair should not be confused with "Feria Anual de Artesanías" which takes place at Plaza del Caribe during the month of October and which started in 2001.

== Sponsorship ==
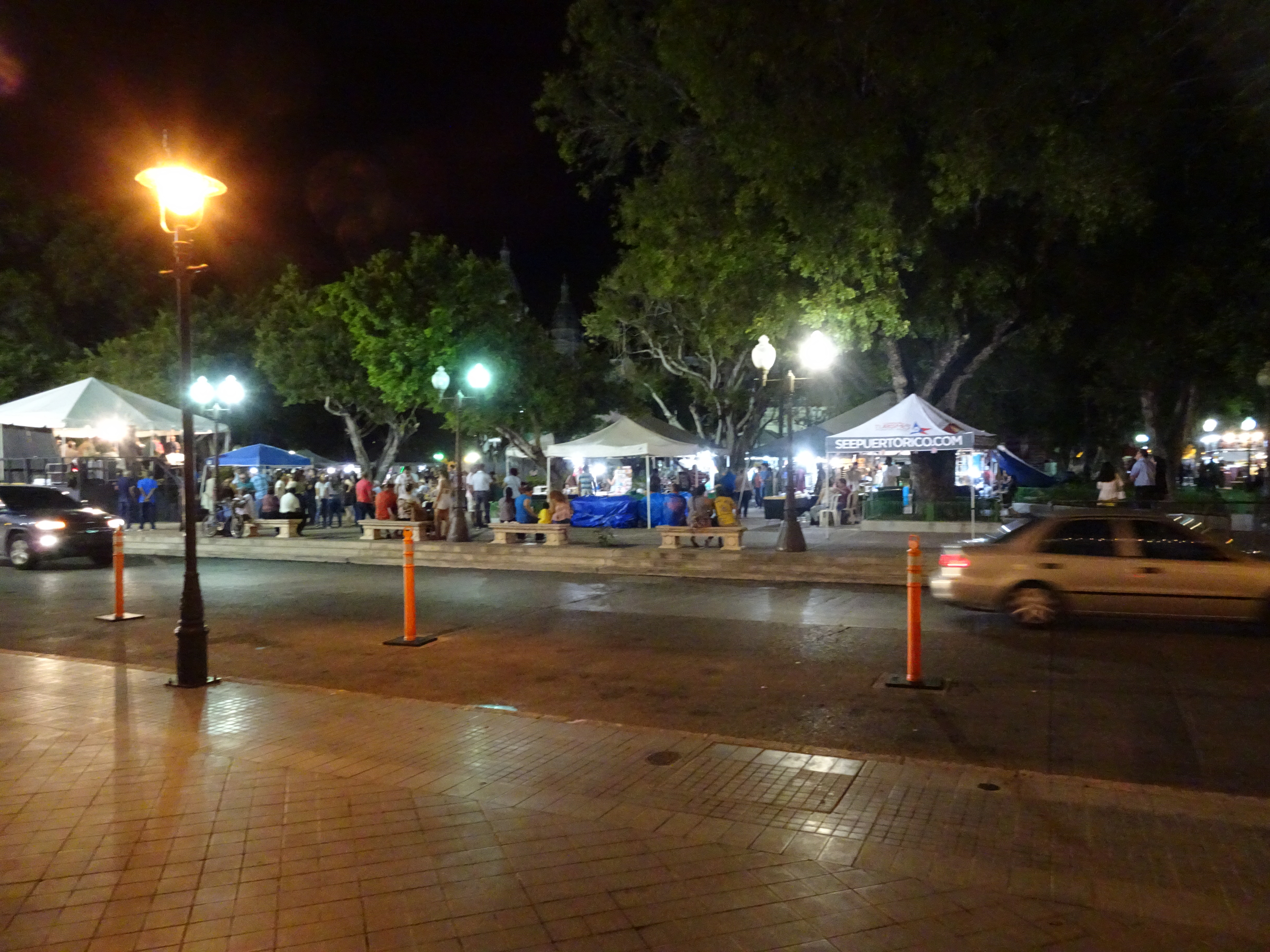
Feria de Artesanías in April 2018

The fair is sponsored by the Centro Cultural de Ponce Carmen Solá de Pereira and the Ponce Municipal Government. The fair is put together with grants from the Instituto de Cultura Puertorriqueña, Puerto Rico Industrial Development Company, and the Ponce Municipal Government plus donations from businesses and local industry including Destileria Serralles.

== Composition ==
The art expo was an additional feature of the fair and it was added in 1985. Over 150 artisans participate in the entire Fair event. Crafts expositions include those based on wood, clay and ceramics, crystal and glass, leather, bamboo and palms, soap and wax, metal and wire, cloth, and paper. Items such as baskets, musical instruments, dolls, religious figures, paper masks and vejigantes are displayed. The crafts shown are offered for sale.

== Typical program ==
Following is the program for the 2018 Ponce Crafts Fair. The program is typical of other years activities.

Typical program
Time	Activity
Friday
8:00 am	Registration of Artisans and Plastic Artists
11:00 am	Fair Opens - Welcoming Remarks
11:10 am	Plena Tres Panderos Singers
Noon	Workshops
1:00 pm	Dr. Pila High School Choir
2:30 pm	Plucked Strings Ensemble (Conjunto de Cuerdas Punteadas)
3:30 pm	Ponce High School Choir
4:30 pm	Tuna Escuela de Derecho PUCPR
5:30 pm	Minstrel Belen Marie and Sentimiento Boricua Singers
6:00 pm	School of Bomba and Plena "Isabel Albizu Davila" and the Umoja Ensemble
7:00 pm	Homenage
8:00 pm	Tipico Mapeye Singers
Saturday
10:00 am	Workshops
11:00 am	Basketry Demo by E. Marcucci y J. Sotomayor
Noon	Steel Band
1:30 pm	Carlos Cruz, Performer of Black Poetry
2:30 pm	Centro Danza
5:00 pm	Conciencia
8:00 pm	Esencia Ensemble
Sunday
11:00 am	Workshops
1:00 pm	Muppet Orchestra
2:30 pm	Cimarrones
3:00 pm	Pico a Pico de Trovadores, Tipico Boricua Singers
5:00 pm	Bomba Workshop by Rafael Mayra Alvarez
8:00 pm	¡Plenéalo!

== See also ==
- Carnaval de Ponce
- Ponce Jazz Festival
- Fiesta Nacional de la Danza
- Día Mundial de Ponce
- Festival Nacional de la Quenepa
- Bienal de Arte de Ponce
- Festival de Bomba y Plena de San Antón
- Carnaval de Vejigantes
- Festival Nacional Afrocaribeño
