= Carnaval de Ponce =

Annual celebration held in Ponce, Puerto Rico

Coordinates: 18°0′00″N 66°37′00″W

- Poster bill of the 2011 Carnaval de Ponce, celebrated 2–8 March 2011, in Ponce, Puerto Rico.
- Official name: Carnaval Ponceño
- Also called: Carnaval de Ponce
- Type: Local, cultural
- Celebrations: Parades, parties, dances, music, food
- Date: Week before Ash Wednesday
- 2025 date: 21 February – 4 March
- Duration: 7 days
- Frequency: Annual
- First time: 1858
- Related to: Lent

The Carnaval de Ponce (English: Ponce Carnival), officially Carnaval Ponceño, is an annual celebration of the Carnival holiday held in Ponce, Puerto Rico. The celebration lasts one week, and like most observations of the holiday ends on Fat Tuesday (Mardi Gras Day, the day before Ash Wednesday). Thus, like the Carnival holiday in general, it is usually held in February and or March. It dates back to 1858. Some authorities, such as the Smithsonian Institution, believe the Ponce Carnaval can be traced to as far back as 250 years ago. The Carnaval coincides with the Mardi Gras of New Orleans, the Carnival of Venice, and Rio de Janeiro's Carnival and hundreds of other places that observe this holiday around the world. The estimated attendance is 100,000. Scenes of the 2011 Carnaval Ponceño were featured in the Travel Channel on 7 August 2011.

== History ==
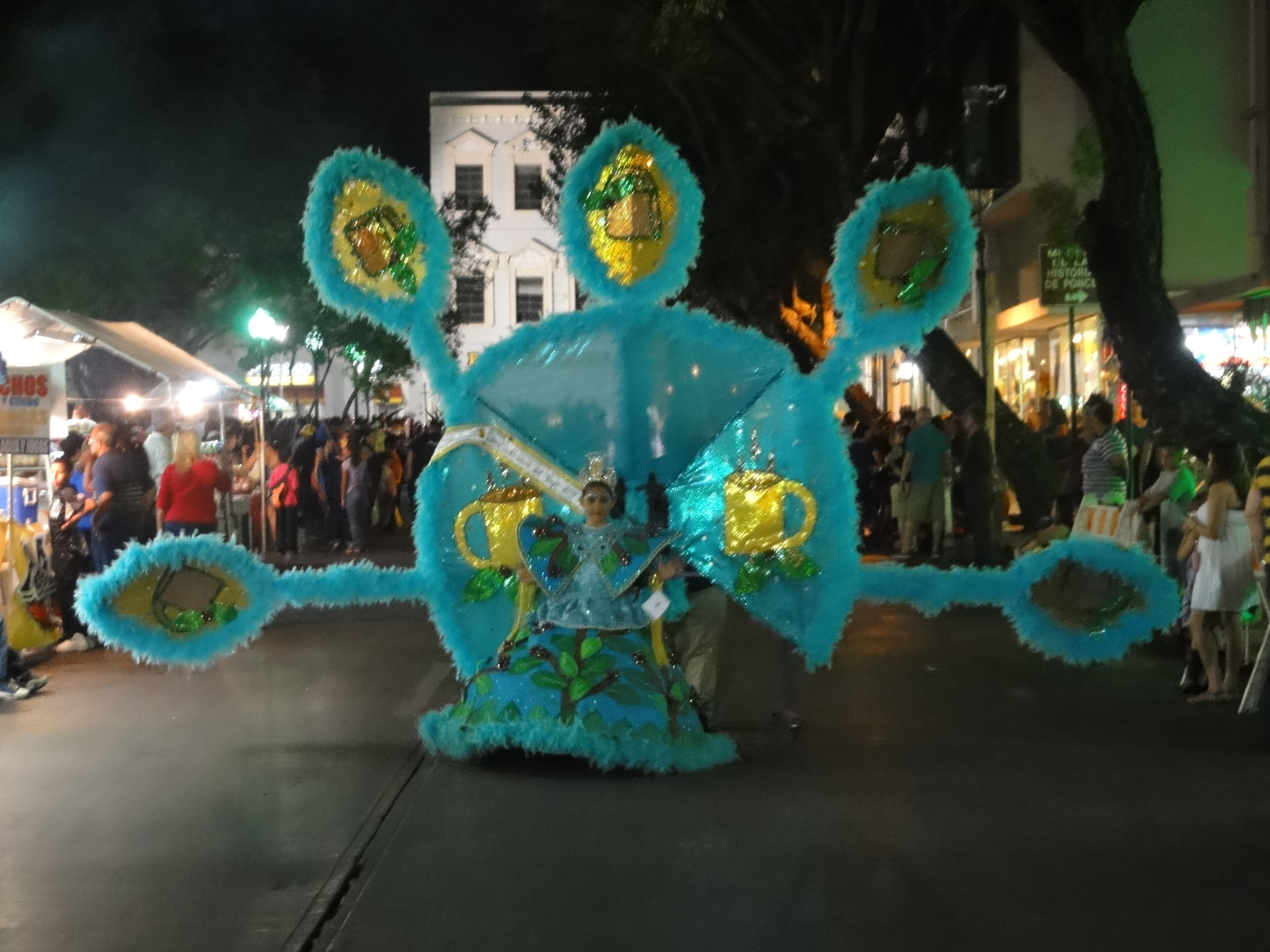
Carnaval de Ponce 2011

There are no documents stating the official origin of the Carnaval, but there are documents mentioning the celebration as early as 1858. The Carnaval de Ponce thus began in 1858 and was started as a mask dance by a Spaniard by the name of José de la Guardia. The masquerade dance continued as a tradition through the years, but it was not until the 1950s that the municipal government added the parade to the Carnaval. In the early 1960s, the Carnaval began to integrate floats that represented civic and cultural institutions, public and private residential communities, schools, colleges and universities, banking, industry and commerce. The Office of Cultural Development of the Municipality of Ponce explains that “it is believed that the influence of the Nice Carnival extended to Barcelona and that immigrants from Barcelona brought it to Ponce. With the passing of time Poceans have added their own touches with Afro-Antillean music that fills the celebrations with percussion, rhythm and happiness."

In June 1995, Carnaval de Ponce was taken to New York City where, during the Puerto Rican Day Parade, over 200 entertainers, folk artists and musicians from Ponce, in addition to the Banda Municipal de Ponce and the Carnival's Queen and Child Queen, marched down New York's Fifth Avenue as part of that City's Puerto Rican Day Celebration. During the week leading to the Parade, folk artists from the Carnaval de Ponce, toured the City teaching children to make the traditional Ponce carnival's masks. In 2012, a local news weekly called Carnaval de Ponce "Puerto Rico's National Carnival".

== Costumes and masks ==
Illustration of a vejigante mask

One of the traditions of the Carnaval is the appearance of the "vejigantes", which is a colorful costume traditionally representing the devil or evil. Vejigantes carry blown cow bladders with which they make sounds and hit carnival attendees throughout the processions.

The traditional vejigante masks of the Ponce carnival are made of paper mache and are characterized by the presence of multiple horns. The mask was developed by Ponce artisans in the early part of the 20th century. They are made from newsprint paper mixed with homemade glue and paint. Sophisticated Ponce carnival masks are sought after by mask collectors and masks from Ponce have become a symbol of Puerto Rico at large.

The Carnaval ends with the Burial of the Sardine, at which point everyone sings a song in Spanish that translates into: The burial of the Sardine event started in 1967. (The Ball Dance was also started in 1967.The burial of the Sardine event started in 1967.

The Carnival is dead now
They are burying him;
Throw just a little dirt in
So he can rise again.

== Economics ==
The municipal government invests close to $100,000 in the Carnival and the event infuses some $500,000 into the city's economy.

== List of events ==
The Carnaval starts on the Wednesday before Ash Wednesday, and the events are as follows.

Wednesday: Vejigantes Party
Thursday: King Momo Entrance Parade
Friday: Crowning of the Child Queen
Saturday: Crowning of the Carnival Adult Queen
Sunday: Main Parade
Monday: Carnival's Ball Dance
Tuesday: Burial of the Sardine

== Carnaval queens and child queens ==
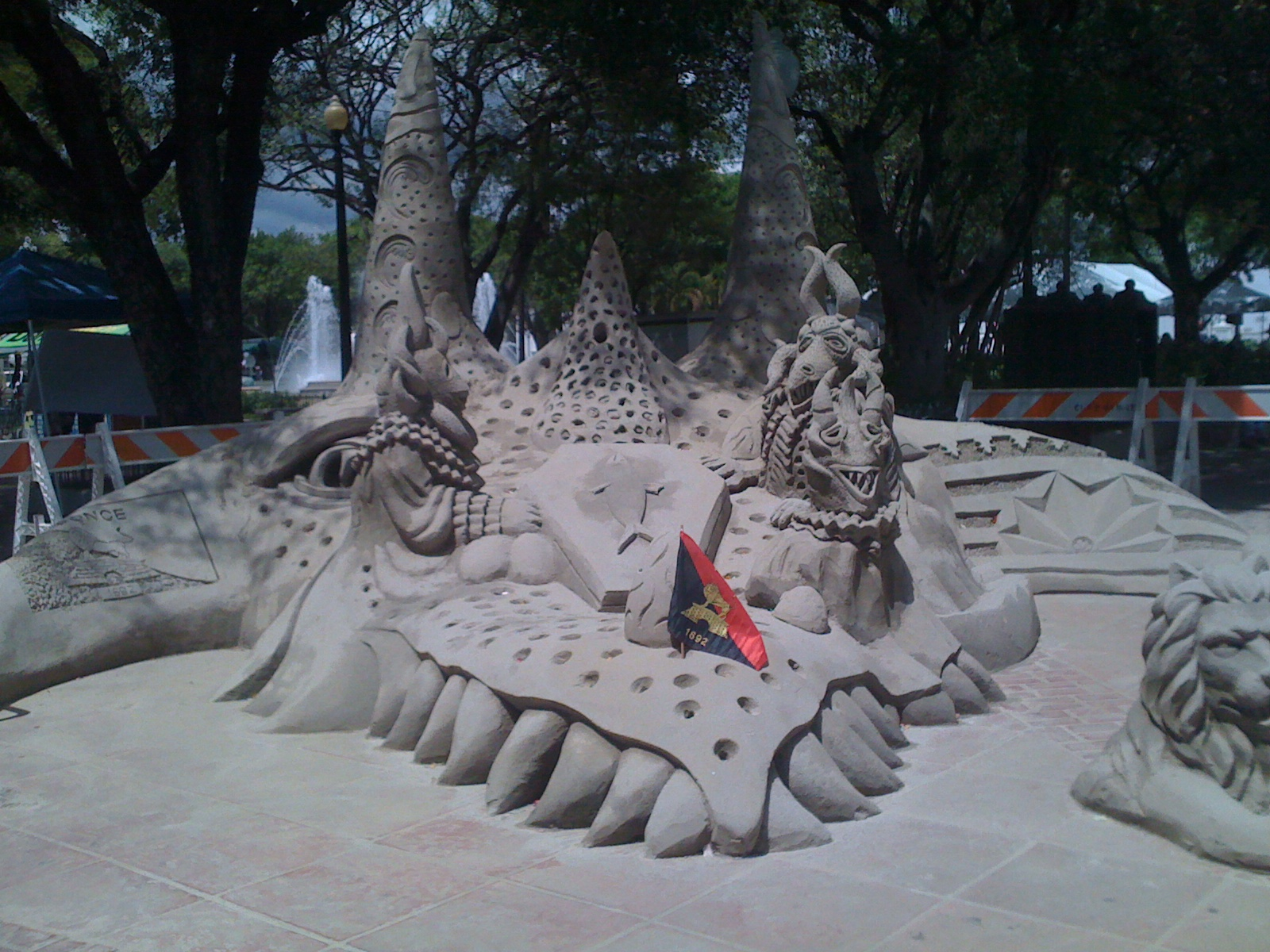
2011 Sand Sculpture by the Sand Masters on Plaza Degetau, Ponce

In 1959, the Carnaval introduced the crowning of a Carnaval queen. This was followed, in 1973, with the crowning of a Carnaval child queen. The following are the Carnaval queens and child queens.

=== Carnaval Queens ===
Queens of the Carnival
| Year | Queen Name |
|---|---|
| 1959 | Leida Luz Llorens |
| 1960 | Leida Luz Llorens |
| 1961 | Leida Luz Llorens |
| 1962 | Esther Noriega |
| 1963 | Edna Ivette Grau |
| 1964 | Edna Ivette Grau |
| 1965 | Ivonne Maria Santiago |
| 1966 | Carmencita Lespier |
| 1967 | Milagros Agostini |
| 1968 | Carmen Milagros Rivera |
| 1969 | Mildred Goyco |
| 1970 | Mayra Irizarry |
| 1971 | Cinthia Boscio |
| 1972 | Gisela Irizarry |
| 1973 | Maria de los Angeles Colon |
| 1974 | Lourdes Maria Rovira |
| 1975 | Alma Minerva Ortiz |
| 1976 | Lourdes Falcon |
| 1977 | Marlene Delgado Brey |
| 1978 | Lourdes Milagros Buzo |
| 1979 | Johanna Bonaparte Duran |
| 1980 | Mariposa Zayas Burgos |
| 1981 | Elizabeth Morales |
| 1982 | Sonja Johanna Maiz Iñesta |
| 1983 | Angeles I. Nieves |
| 1984 | Rayna Judith Rivera Fernandez |
| 1985 | Patricia Rovira Vechini |
| 1986 | Natalia Rodriguez Deynes |
| 1987 | Sonia Farinacci Morales |
| 1988 | Awilda Lopez Cepero |
| 1989 | Geraldina Ann Vidal Cavas |
| 1990 | Brenda I. Rivera |
| 1991 | Elsie M. Velez Miranda |
| 1992 | Elaina Rodriguez Spenser |
| 1993 | Virmarie Figueroa Rodriguez |
| 1994 | Maria de los Angeles Buzo |
| 1995 | Raqueline Martinez Uriarte |
| 1996 | Leslie Bermejo Velazquez |
| 1997 | Eugenik Gonzalez de Leon |
| 1998 | Yara M. Velazquez Rivera |
| 1999 | Miheydic Rodriguez Georgi |
| 2000 | Ludmila del Carmen Pagan Ocasio |
| 2001 | Luzmarie Borrero Rodriguez |
| 2002 | Karen Marie Molina |
| 2003 | Robelyn Caraballo Ramirez |
| 2004 | Miraida Rodriguez Muniz |
| 2005 | Anabeliz Alindato Figueroa |
| 2006 | Pamela Sierra Rivera |
| 2007 | Vilmarie Reyes Flores |
| 2008 | Christal J. Ponce Roman |
| 2009 | Alisheanne Santiago Coll |
| 2010 | Xiomara Ramirez Rodriguez |
| 2011 | Solymar Feliciano Montero |
| 2012 | Christal Nicole Gonzalez Rivera |
| 2013 | Stephanie Echevarría Llanes |
| 2014 | Glorymar Batista Rivera |
| 2015 | Keishla N. Rodriguez de Jesus |
| 2016 | Keishla Marie Correa Dides |
| 2017 | Maytes L. Rivera Vargas |
| 2018 | Maytes L. Rivera Vargas |
| 2019 | Adlin Camille Mendez Vargas |
| 2020 | Kayra Figueroa de Jesús (Note: Due to the COVID-19 pandemic, the event was a one-day only event and took place on 23 February 2020.) |
| 2021 | Kayra Figueroa de Jesus |
| 2022 | Julianna Elis Guilbe Serrano |
| 2023 | Caridad M. Muñiz Sepulveda |
| 2024 | Gamalish Joan Ruiz Narvaez. |

=== Carnaval Child queens ===
Child Queens of the Carnival
| Year | Child Queen Name |
|---|---|
| 1973 | Maribel Primera |
| 1974 | Shelly de la Concha |
| 1975 | Ainee Rodriguez Gonzalez |
| 1976 | Lynette Rosado Colon |
| 1977 | Janice Vanessa Torres Torres |
| 1978 | Marilyne Capote |
| 1979 | Elizabeth Lopez |
| 1980 | Monica Yadira Rosado Plascencia |
| 1981 | Jeanette Santiago |
| 1982 | Emma Raquel Gordian Vega |
| 1983 | Bethzaida Rodriguez Velez |
| 1984 | Michelle Lopez Asencio |
| 1985 | Jessica Linette Castro Vidal |
| 1986 | Solange Isabel de Lahongrais Taylor |
| 1987 | Lucila I. Chardon Penna |
| 1988 | Jeniffer Denice Luna Doiu |
| 1989 | Fremiotte J. Rugual Garcia |
| 1990 | Maria Mercedes Armstrong |
| 1991 | Diriee Y. Rodriguez |
| 1992 | Melissa A. Lajara Silva |
| 1993 | Luz M. Borrero Rodriguez |
| 1994 | Jonaida A. Oliveras Pabon |
| 1995 | Zuleika M. Roque Vargas |
| 1996 | Carla Michelle |
| 1997 | Lillie M. Rodriguez Clavell |
| 1998 | Francheska Rodriguez Sopeña |
| 1999 | Karely M. Velez Carlo |
| 2000 | Glorimar Batista Rivera |
| 2001 | Stephania M. Rivera San Antonio |
| 2002 | Christal J. Ponce Roman |
| 2003 | Jennifer M. Rivera San Antonio |
| 2004 | Layla N. Velazquez Rivera |
| 2005 | Christal M. Velez Carlo |
| 2006 | Aida I. Garcia Munoz |
| 2007 | Joymar Ramirez Villadares |
| 2008 | Marisabel Montalvo Ruiz |
| 2009 | Betimar Alcala Cintron |
| 2010 | Naomi Mercado Cordero |
| 2011 | Gabriela Bonilla Duque |
| 2012 | Sullymar Rangel Maldonado |
| 2013 | Dayivette Díaz Rosado |
| 2014 | Joanne M. Ruberté Rivera |
| 2015 | Jomary A. Ruberté Rivera |
| 2016 | Jamillys G. Santiago Feliciano |
| 2017 | Alanis M. Torres Irizarry |
| 2018 | Alanis M. Torres Irizarry |
| 2019 | Gloriangely Velez Batista |
| 2020 | Allyson Soley Sánchez Pérez (Note: Due to the COVID-19 pandemic, the event was a one-day only event and took place on 23 February 2020.) |
| 2021 | Allison Sanchez Perez |
| 2022 | Jenny Liann Vazquez Belfort |
| 2023 | Laila Rachel Farinacci Guilbe |
| 2024 | Mireia Antonella Medina Perez. |

== See also ==
- Feria de Artesanías de Ponce
- Ponce Jazz Festival
- Fiesta Nacional de la Danza
- Día Mundial de Ponce
- Festival Nacional de la Quenepa
- Bienal de Arte de Ponce
- Festival de Bomba y Plena de San Antón
- Carnaval de Vejigantes
- Festival Nacional Afrocaribeño
