= Vejigante =

Folkloric character featured in Puerto Rican festival celebrations

Illustration of a vejigante mask.

A vejigante is a folkloric character in Puerto Rican festival celebrations, mainly seen during Carnival time. Traditional colors of the vejigantes were green, yellow and red, or red and black. Today, vejigantes wear brightly colored, ornate masks corresponding to the colors of their costumes that detail bat-like wings. The term vejigante derives from the words vejiga (bladder) and gigante (giant) due to custom of blowing up and painting cow bladders. The masks are often linked to festivals that continue today, especially in Loíza and Ponce.

== Origin ==
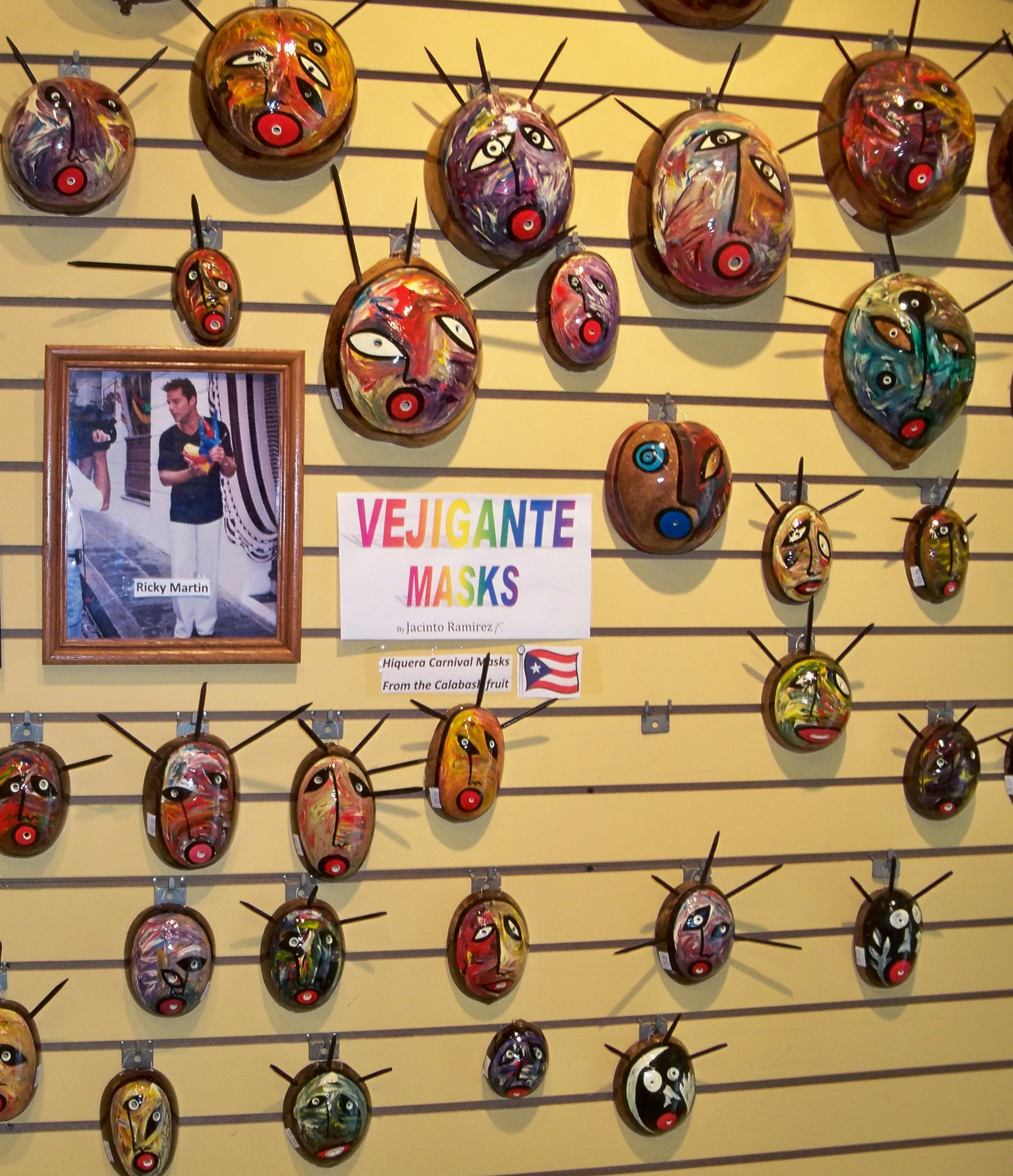
Vejigante masks on display in San Juan, Puerto Rico

In the 12th century, St. James the Apostle, the patron saint of Spain, was once believed in Spanish legend to have led the Catholic militia in the mythical Battle of Clavijo to victory against the Moors in 844. On his saints day, when people celebrated the victory, the vejigante represented the defeated Moors.

By the 17th century, it was typical to see processionals in Spain in which vejigantes were demons meant to terrify people into going back to church. There is a reference to vejigantes in Cervantes' Don Quixote written in 1615, when they were used to symbolize the Devil in the battle between good and evil.

In Puerto Rico, this processional took on a new look because of the African and Taíno influence. Taínos, creators of pottery and deities called cemis, proved to be excellent mask makers. Vejigante masks are usually meant to look scary.

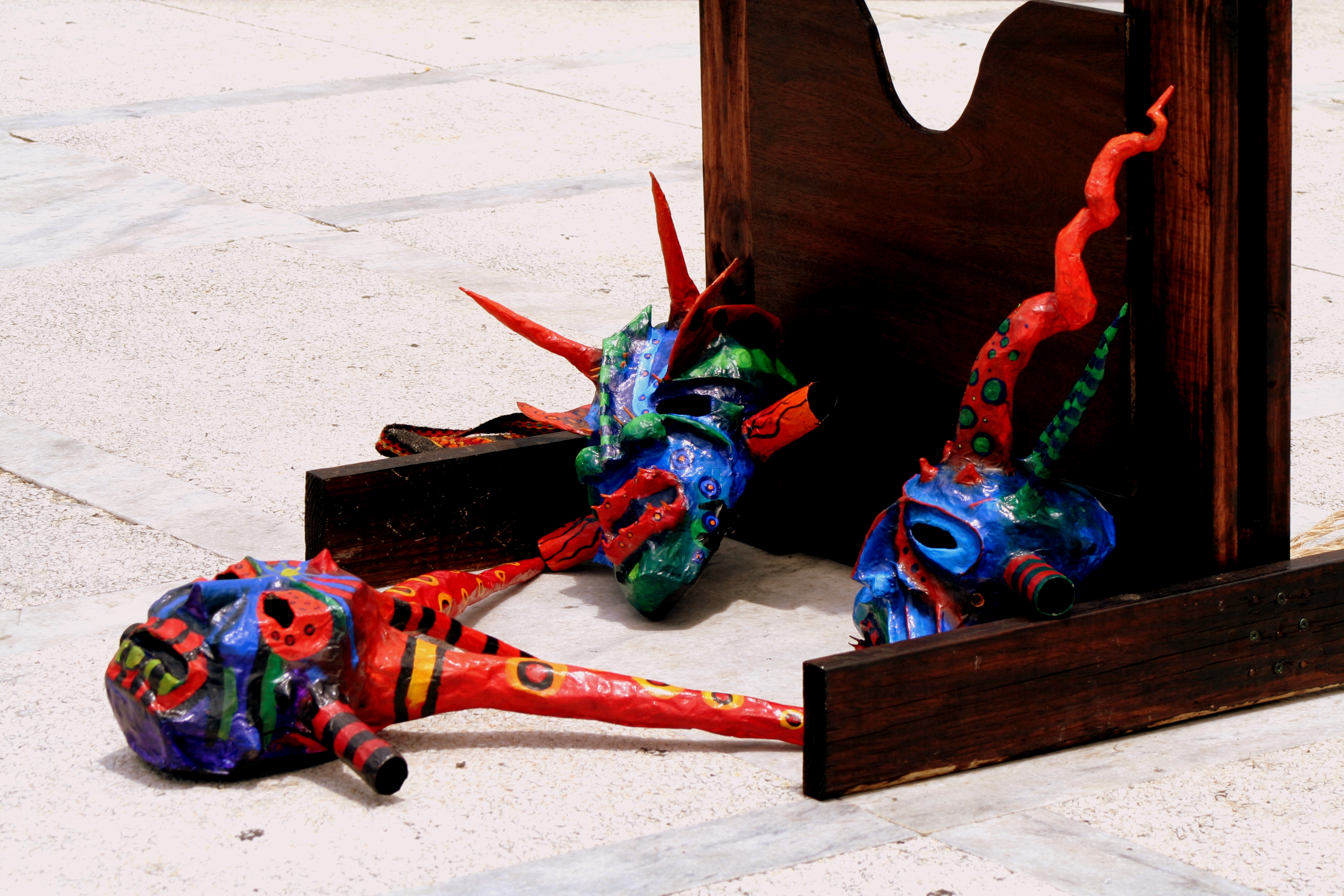
Vejigantes

== Festivals of St. James ==
The Catholic Feast of St. James the Apostle, otherwise known as Santiago Apóstol, is celebrated in Puerto Rico on the 25th of July. Several processions honoring St. James usually begin on the following day in Loíza Aldea and its vicinity, featuring several characters that appear during it: "el caballero", "los vejigantes", "los viejos", and "las locas".

Vejigantes in particular generally are known to engage in intimidating behavior, such as howling and screaming, symbolizing evil, the Devil, and the Moors who fought St. James in the legend, while the caballeros who ride on horseback signify the knights who aided in St. James' triumph. It was even once common for vejigante performers to carry a stick with a vejiga, or air-filled bladder, and strike passersby with it, to further emphasize their menacing role in the performance. Viejos and Las locas typically have a greater role in the street activity, especially music and dancing.

In contrast to the annual Vejigante Carnival in Ponce, the vejigante figures during the Feast of St. James have their own characteristics, typically wearing masks made from coconuts instead of papier-mache traditional Ponce masks are made from.

In today's festivals, some contemporary artists and scholars believe that the vejigante is a figure of resistance to colonialism and imperialism.

== In specific towns ==
=== Loíza ===
In Loíza, the vejigante masks are made from coconut, whose cortex has been carved out to allow a human face. The eyes and mouth are carved out of the coconut with an addition of bamboo teeth. The costume is made of "a jumper" that has a lot of extra fabric at the arms to simulate wings.

=== Ponce ===
In Ponce, the vejigante masks are made from papier-mâché and usually contain many horns. There is a yearly celebration in Barrio Playa, Ponce, that lasts three days called Carnaval de Vejigantes. The jump suit is very similar to the jumpers used in Loiza.

== In popular culture ==
Marvel Comics released a one-shot comic book called Fantastic Four in... Ataque del M.O.D.O.K. which debuted a Puerto Rican superhero called El Vejigante, based on this figure.

The Minor League Baseball team, Scranton/Wilkes-Barre RailRiders, as part of MiLB's Copa de la Diversión initiative, play multiple games each season as the Vejigantes.

In 2024, Puerto Rican wrestler, Damian Priest, wore a vejigante mask during his entrance at Wrestlemania XL.

== Gallery ==
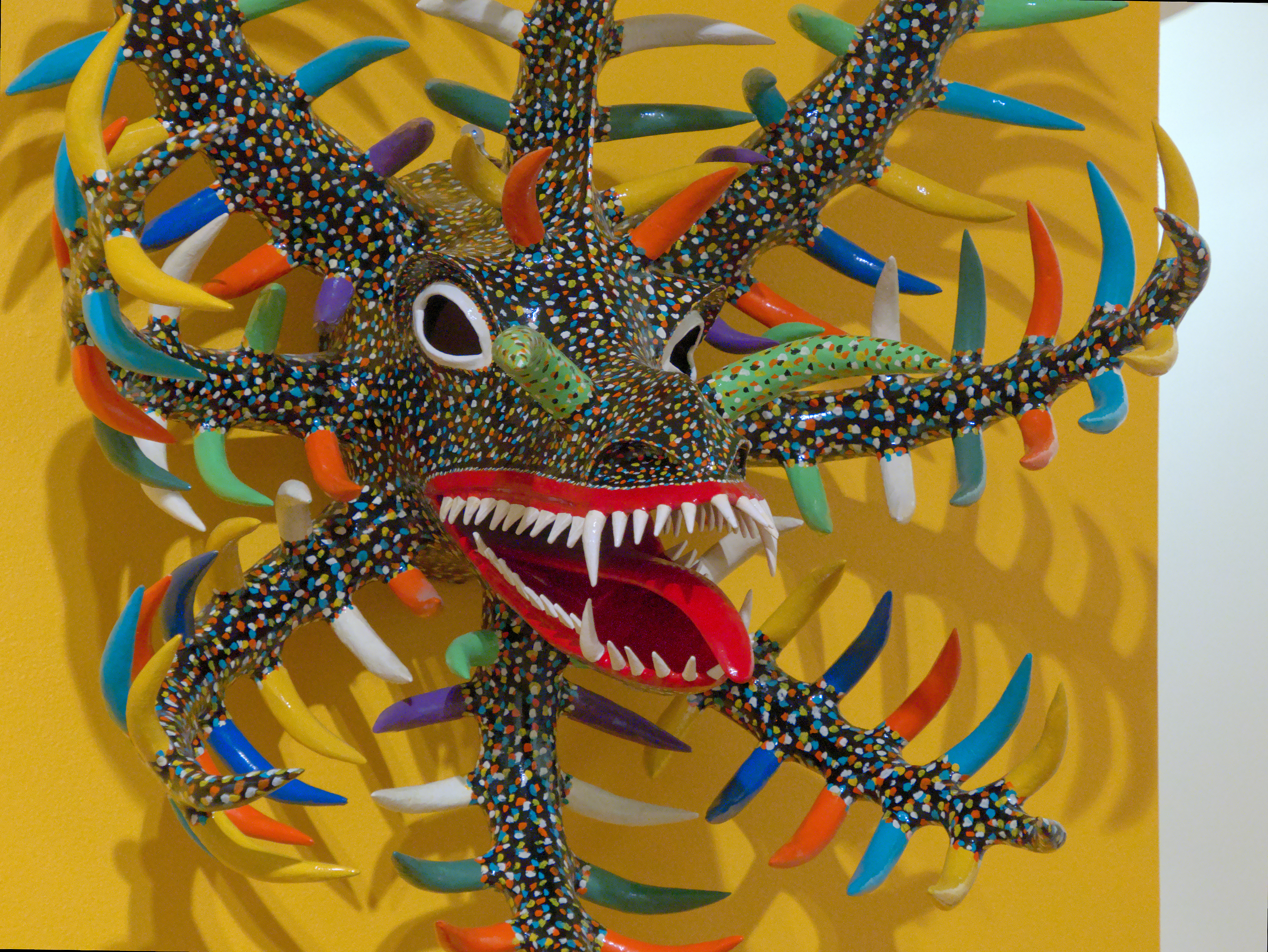
Vejigante in the Puerto Rican Museum of Art

== See also ==
- Carnaval de Ponce
