= Ponce Jazz Festival =

Annual musical celebration in Ponce, Puerto Rico

Coordinates: 18°0′00″N 66°37′00″W

- Logo of the Ponce Jazz Festival
- Official name: Ponce Jazz Festival
- Also called: The Jazz Festival
- Observed by: Ponce, Puerto Rico
- Type: Local, cultural
- Celebrations: Music
- Observances: Yearly
- Date: Last weekend in April
- Duration: 3 days
- Frequency: annual
- Related to: http://www.poncejazzfestival.com/ Website

The Ponce Jazz Festival is a musical celebration that takes place every year in Ponce, Puerto Rico.

== History ==
The festival is one of the newest in the Western Hemisphere. It was inaugurated in 2012. It takes place at the Concha Acustica (English: acoustical shell) Amphitheatre of Parque de la Abolición in Barrio Cuarto.

== List of events ==
=== 2012 edition ===
The festival starts on the last Friday of April, and the 2012 events were as follows:

Friday 27 April 2012
Grupo Zambaríbiri Stage Band (Guayanilla)
Escuela de Música de Guayama
Grupo Sound Jazz y Jazz Jam

Saturday 28 April 2012
Edwin Gutiérrez & Jazz Project
Charlie Sepúlveda & The Turnaround Band
Julito Alvarado and his group Del Sur al Norte

Sunday 29 April 2012
Eugenio Torres & Sol Creciente
Banda Municipal de Ponce, Carlos Juan Colón & Manus, and William Cepeda

=== 2013 edition ===
The 2013 events were as follows.

Friday, 26 April 2013
Stage Band – Instituto de Musica Juan Morel Campos
Diversis Quartet
Flautista Joche Caraballo and his Trio
Irvin Cancel and his Band

Saturday, 27 April 2013
Luis Gonzalez & his Orchestra
Joseito Ruiz & Quartet
PuertoSax

Sunday, 29 April 2013
Black Jazz
Master Jazz Big Band

== See also ==
- Carnaval de Ponce
- Feria de Artesanías de Ponce
- Fiesta Nacional de la Danza
- Día Mundial de Ponce
- Festival Nacional de la Quenepa
- Bienal de Arte de Ponce
- Festival de Bomba y Plena de San Antón
- Carnaval de Vejigantes
- Festival Nacional Afrocaribeño
