= Festival de Bomba y Plena de San Antón =

Annual celebration held in Ponce, Puerto Rico

Coordinates: 18°0′00″N 66°37′00″W

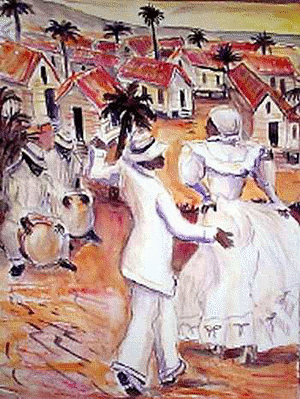
- Festival de Bomba y Plena de San Antón
- Official name: Festival de Bomba y Plena de San Antón
- Type: Local, cultural
- Celebrations: Music, food, dancing
- Date: Varies (July to November)
- Duration: 10 days
- Frequency: Annual
- First time: 1978
- Related to: Bomba and Plena

The Festival de Bomba y Plena de San Antón (English: San Anton's Bomba and Plena Festival), is an annual celebration held in Ponce, Puerto Rico, as an extravaganza celebration of Bomba and Plena music genres and the traditions of Ponce's barrio San Antón. The celebration lasts 10 days and it ends on a Sunday. It is generally held in July but sometimes in November.

== History ==
The festival started in 1978. It started when Barrio San Antón residents united to oppose plans by municipal authorities to re-zone the San Antón area that would have resulted in the replacement of their existing mix of wooden and concrete neighborhood homes and the construction, instead, of multi-story residential buildings. The festival had a 10-year hiatus from 1998 to 2008. It is held at placita Pedro Arce of Barrio San Antón, Ponce, Puerto Rico. It takes place on over 10 days, sometimes on a weekend (3 days).

The festival generated tremendous interest, and other Puerto Rico municipalities have started their own bomba and plena festivals, including Dorado, Aguas Buenas, Loiza, and Mayagüez. In 2010, the Puerto Rico legislative assembly declared Barrio San Antón a historic site and the "cradle of Plena music".

== Venues ==
The festival takes place at Placita Pedro Arce in Barrio San Anton. At times the venue for the activity has been changed to other locations in the municipality, such as Paseo Tablado La Guancha.

== See also ==
- Feria de Artesanías de Ponce
- Carnaval de Ponce
- Ponce Jazz Festival
- Fiesta Nacional de la Danza
- Día Mundial de Ponce
- Festival Nacional de la Quenepa
- Bienal de Arte de Ponce
- Carnaval de Vejigantes
- Festival Nacional Afrocaribeño
