= Carnaval de Vejigantes =

Annual celebration held in Ponce, Puerto Rico

Coordinates: 18°0′00″N 66°37′00″W

- Typical poster used to announce the carnival
- Official name: Carnaval de Vejigantes de La Playa de Ponce
- Also called: Carnaval de La Playa, Carnaval de Vejigantes
- Type: Local, cultural
- Celebrations: Parade, dancing, food, parties
- Date: Weeks leading to Ash Wednesday
- Duration: 3 days
- Frequency: Annual
- First time: 1991
- Related to: Lent

The Carnaval de Vejigantes, officially Carnaval de Vejigantes de La Playa de Ponce, is an annual celebration held at Barrio Playa in Ponce, Puerto Rico. The celebration, which commonly lasts three to five days, generally takes place in late January or early February. It started in 1991. It takes place at Parque Lucy Grillasca on PR-585 in Barrio Playa. The parade, one of the highlights of the carnival, usually takes off from Cancha Salvador Dijols on Avenida Hostos (PR-123) and ends at Parque Lucy Grillasca (PR-585). Attendance is estimated at over 15,000 people. It is attended by people from all over Puerto Rico, and some attendees are from as far as the United States. It is organized and operated by a community, civic, NGO group, not by any government or government agency.

This carnival is different from many other carnivals in that attendees are not mere spectators, but people who are encouraged to take part in the carnival. The public is actually encouraged to come with their panderos, vejigante masks, güiros and maracas and participate ad hoc. The carnival has been called the "antesala" (gateway) to lent and to the Ponce Carnival: "This carnaval is not a fiesta patronal nor a festival. It's a town party and its essence lies in a public that participates." It aims to strengthen family bonds, create long-lasting memories, share together as a community, and keep local traditions alive.

The Carnival brings together some 1,200 artists, including some 10 music bands, groups of vejigantes with over 40 people each, over 100 masked vejigantes, choreographed dancers, plus the thousands of locals who join in. This carnival has been described as a "townspeople feast of controlled chaos." Besides music, dance and food, the carnivals also features amusement rides, artisans, cheerleaders, jugglers, and arts and crafts, among other attractions. There are also workshops for children on how to make vejigante masks.

== History ==
It was started by a 13-year-old boy named Ricardo Santiago Román, who later became a municipal employee. The first parade started off from the Alfredo Agyayo High School on Avenida Hostos and marched down the street where the Candita y Matías Store was located (Calle Colón, now named Calle José Antonio Salamán). It would end in front of their store. Some people believe that the origins of the Carnaval de Vejigantes and the first masked vejigante dance in Ponce took place in Barrio Playa sometime before the 1858 date usually attributed to the start of the Ponce Carnival.

== Planning and security ==
Several activities take place in the days leading to the carnival date. These include a press conference, an informal vejigante run through the streets of Barrio Playa to promote the motto of that year's carnival, and a mini carnival at the casino of the Ponce Hilton Hotel, oriented to the elderly. Both pre-carnival and carnival events are well staffed by security and law enforcement personnel and, by its 28th edition (2018), no security incidents had occurred.

== Costumes and masks ==
Illustration of a vejigante mask

The main feature of the carnival is the display of vejigante customs, and mostly focused on their masks. Traditionally the masks have been hand-made by skilled artisans from Barrio Playa. Vejigantes carry blown cow bladders with which they make sounds and chase after the carnival spectators throughout the processions.

The traditional vejigante masks of the Ponce Playa Carnival are made of paper mache and are characterized by the presence of multiple horns. The mask was developed by Ponce artisans in the early part of the 20th century. They are made from newsprint paper mixed with homemade glue and paint. Sophisticated Ponce carnival masks are sought after by mask collectors and masks from Ponce have become a symbol of Puerto Rico at large. The Carnaval de Vejigantes ends with the Burial of the Sardine. People of all ages, from children to those in their 70s wear the vejigante customs to participate.

== List of events ==
The Carnaval usually starts on a Wednesday and the events are typically as follows.

Wednesday: King Momo Entrance Parade
Thursday: Carnival's Vejigantes Dance
Friday: Crowning of the Carnival Adult and Child Queens
Saturday: Grand Parade
Sunday: Burial of the Sardine

== Grand marshal ==
The grand marshal of the 2018 edition was the actress and singer Carmen Nydia Velázquez, who was herself born in Barrio Playa.

== Carnaval queens and child queens ==
The 2010 carnival queen was Paola Nicole Medina Gastón. Karelys Michelle Medina was the child queen in 2013, and Alanis Zoé Benito Martínez was in 2014. The 2013 carnival queen was Yamilette Torres Peña, and the one for 2014 was Daisy Correa Dides. In 2016, Helga Camacho was selected carnival queen and Paulette Marie Rodríguez was the queen for 2016. The 2017 carnival queen was Eva Marie. The 2018 Carnival queen was 17-year-old Shelimar Rodríguez Limardo; the 2019 was 48-year-old Jackeline Acabeo López, a nurse. The 2019 queen was Shalimar Rodríguez Limardo.

== See also ==
- Feria de Artesanías de Ponce
- Ponce Jazz Festival
- Fiesta Nacional de la Danza
- Día Mundial de Ponce
- Festival Nacional de la Quenepa
- Bienal de Arte de Ponce
- Festival de Bomba y Plena de San Antón
- Festival Nacional Afrocaribeño
