= Fiesta Nacional de la Danza =

Annual cultural celebration in Ponce, Puerto Rico

Coordinates: 18°0′00″N 66°37′00″W

- Promotional poster for the 2015 Fiesta Nacional de la Danza
- Official name: Fiesta Nacional de la Danza
- Observed by: Puerto Ricans in Ponce, Puerto Rico
- Type: Local, cultural, musical
- Significance: The city's native musical genre
- Celebrations: Music, dancing, crafts, food
- Observances: Yearly
- Date: Mid-May
- Duration: 7 days
- Frequency: Annual
- First time: 1972
- Related to: Danza

The Fiesta Nacional de la Danza (English: National Danza Festival), also known as Semana de la Danza Puertorriqueña (English: Puerto Rican Danza Week), is a cultural celebration that takes place every year in Ponce, Puerto Rico. The festival centers on the danza, a musical genre native from the city of Ponce and oftentimes called "Puerto Rico's classical music" with rhythm, tune, and cadence that are similar to the waltz. The celebration lasts a week and takes place in mid-May. It is sponsored by the Ponce Municipal Government and the Institute of Puerto Rican Culture.

== History ==
The island-wide celebration has been sponsored by the Government of Puerto Rico since at least 1972, when it was codified into Law (Act 20 of April 26, 1972) that the Institute of Puerto Rican Culture was to sponsor the celebration of the Puerto Rican Danza Week every year during the birthday of Juan Morel Campos. However, in Ponce that celebration had already been taken place since the nineteenth century.

== Venue and characteristics ==
Chamber orchestras perform under the night lights of Plaza Las Delicias, while neatly dressed and groomed couples dance to the tune of its "high society" musical form. Other venues for the week-long event are at Concha Acústica and Parque Urbano Dora Colón Clavell.

== Events ==
The dance concerts celebrate the stately music of string quartets "and the 19th century ballroom dance that was the hallmark of island sophistication during the days when elegance and manners were more important" than today. The event includes conferences, danzas and a concert by string quartets, a parade, a danza competition, and demonstrations by senior couples who dress up as they used to in the 19th century. The main event is a danza competition where participants dance to the tune of the Ponce Municipal Band.

The celebration honors the birthday of Juan Morel Campos, "the most prolific danza composer."

== Typical program ==
Events, venues and times are typically as follows:

- Monday afternoon at Plaza Las Delicias

Opening ceremony typically including a flower offering at the statue of Juan Morel Campos and an opening talk about Juan Morel Campos and other famed Puerto Rican danza musicians. This ceremony is usually accompanied by a musical presentation by students from the Escuela Libre de Música and the Instituto de Música Juan Morel Campos

- Tuesday evening at the Teatro La Perla Annex

Dialogue about the Puerto Rican danza with members of the Banda Municipal de Ponce

- Wednesday evening at the Instituto de Música Juan Morel Campos

A speech by one of the directors of the Conservatorio de Música de Puerto Rico commemorating the birthday of Juan Morel Campos. Often includes musical demonstrations by music instructors from music schools in Puerto Rico

- Thursday evening at the Teatro La Perla Annex

Danza music performance by a musical company group.

- Friday evening at Teatro La Perla

Show demonstrating the musical achievements by students at Instituto de Música Juan Morel Campos

- Saturday evening at Museo Francisco "Pancho" Coimbre

Outdoors concert by students from Escuela Libre de Música and danza groups.

- Sunday afternoon at Teatro La Perla

Danza performance competition.

== See also ==
- Carnaval de Ponce
- Feria de Artesanías de Ponce
- Ponce Jazz Festival
- Día Mundial de Ponce
- Festival Nacional de la Quenepa
- Bienal de Arte de Ponce
- Museo de la Música Puertorriqueña
- Festival de Bomba y Plena de San Antón
- Carnaval de Vejigantes
- Festival Nacional Afrocaribeño
