= Día Mundial de Ponce =

Cultural celebration held in Ponce, Puerto Rico

Coordinates: 18°0′00″N 66°37′00″W

- Logo of Día Mundial de Ponce 2012
- Official name: Día Mundial de Ponce
- Observed by: Ponceños in Ponce, Puerto Rico
- Type: Local, cultural, historical
- Significance: Celebration of the historical and cultural heritage of the city and its citizens
- Celebrations: Parade, cultural festivals
- Observances: Yearly
- Date: Late August or early September
- Duration: 7 days
- Frequency: annual
- Related to: Culture and History

Día Mundial de Ponce (Ponce World Day) is a cultural celebration held in Ponce, Puerto Rico, every year during the month of September. The celebration actually starts the Monday before Labor Day with various evening-time cultural festivities. It then culminates with the grand parade that takes place on the Sunday before Labor Day. The celebration started in 2012 and has an estimated attendance of 4,000 people. The week-long event aims to celebrate the cultural heritage of the city by giving tribute to the organizations, the people and "the great sons and daughters of the city of Ponce." The first year of this celebration, the Grand Parade took place on the last Sunday of the celebration, but starting in 2013, the week-long events ended on a Saturday and the Grand Parade was changed to take place the last Saturday. That year the celebration was also changed to occur the last weekend of September, rather than the weekend before Labor Day.

== Attributes ==
The motto of the celebration is "Ponce, Orgullo de Todos" (English: Ponce, Everyone's Pride)

== History ==
The celebration dates back to an idea that Ponce native Rafael Serrano Segarra had while in flight to Ponce from the United States in 2011. While reading a magazine on board the airliner he came across an article about how the residents of Manchester, England, held an annual celebration of pride for their city. It occurred to Serrano Segarra that Ponceños could do something similar in their city. On 21 June 2011, Serrano presented his ideas to a group of concerned Ponceños at the Antiguo Casino de Ponce. On 28 November 2011 Serrano created the non-profit organization Comité Pro Día Mundial de Ponce (Committee Pro Dia Mundial de Ponce) to set the basis for obtaining approval for the concept. In December 2011, the Puerto Rico Senate approved the Sunday before Labor Day as Día Mundial de Ponce, and the celebrations started. The first celebration took place on 2 September 2012. The first year of this celebration, the Grand Parade took place on the last Sunday of the celebration, but starting in 2013, the week-long events ended on a Saturday and the Grand Parade was changed to take place that day. Rafael Serrano, president and founder of the event, September was chosen for the event because, according to him, there are three dates in September associated with the founding of the city.

== List of events ==
The celebration starts on the Monday before the Labor Day weekend, and the 2012 events were as follows. All the celebrations took place in the city of Ponce.

Monday (27 Aug): The "Tommy Muñiz Theatrical Festival", featuring the theatrical show "Maten a Borges" at Teatro La Perla.

Tuesday (28 Aug): The "Juan Viguié Film Festival", featuring the film "The Life of Isabel La Negra (Original film title in English: "Life of Sin") at Teatro La Perla.

Wednesday (29 Aug, 7:30 p.m.): The "El Canto del León" Lyrical Poetic Reading dedicated to the musical legacy of Antonio Paoli, at the Antonio Paoli Theater, Interamerican University of Puerto Rico at Ponce.

Thursday (30, 7 Aug p.m.): The "Rosario Ferré Book Fair", featuring the presentation of the book "Los Rostros Rayados", by Dr. Fernando Picó, regarding the life in Ponce from 1800 to 1830, the years that helped turn the city into Puerto Rico's "Capital Alterna" (Alternative Capital), at Escuela de Bellas Artes de Ponce. Concurrent with the "Miguel Pou Fine Arts Festival", featuring "Voces Ponceñas", an art exposition about Ponce by Ponce artists, also at Escuela de Bellas Artes.

Friday (31 Aug): The "Ednita Nazario Romantic Music Festival", featuring "Bohemia Caribeña", a medley of over 30 musical artists interpreting musical selections, with drinks and Hors d'oeuvres, at Plaza del Mercado Isabel II.

Saturday (Sept 1, 8 p.m.): The "Henry Hutchinson Classical Music Festival", featuring a classical music concert by Venezuelan pianist Vanessa Pérez, at the Antonio Paoli Theater, Interamerican University of Puerto Rico at Ponce.

Sunday (Sept 2): Holy Mass at Catedral Nuestra Señora de Guadalupe by Ponce Bishop Félix Lázaro Martínez, followed by an open house at Museo de Arte de Ponce, and followed by an 11 o'clock minute of citywide cheering and honking throughout the city. This was then followed by the 3 p.m. "Grand Parade" covering over 2 miles of city streets.

== 2013 Edition ==
The 2013 edition of the celebration took place on 21 September 2013 with the participation of over 3,500 participants, in addition to the cheering public.

== See also ==
- Carnaval de Ponce
- Feria de Artesanías de Ponce
- Ponce Jazz Festival
- Fiesta Nacional de la Danza
- Festival Nacional de la Quenepa
- Bienal de Arte de Ponce
- Festival de Bomba y Plena de San Antón
- Carnaval de Vejigantes
- Festival Nacional Afrocaribeño
