= Nightlife in Ponce, Puerto Rico =

Aspect of life in Ponce, Puerto Rico

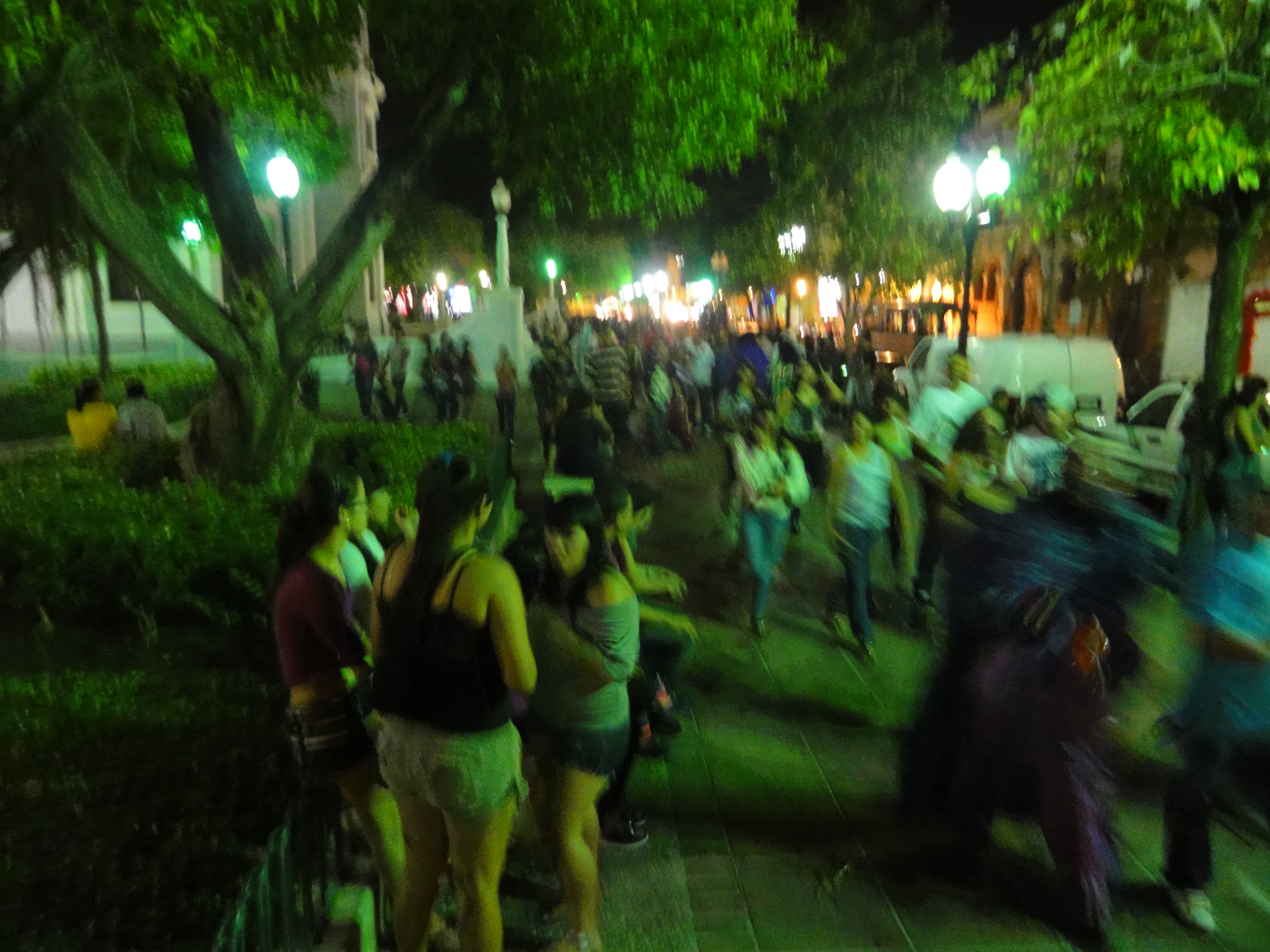
Party in Plaza Las Delicias.

Nightlife in Ponce, Puerto Rico includes government and regulatory aspects, societal and cultural attitudes, and age- and gender-centric issues relative to adult and family life after dark in the city of Ponce. It focuses on all entertainment that is available and generally more popular from the late evening into the early hours of the morning. It includes activities like parties, bands and live music, concerts, and stand-up comedies, and venues such as pubs, bars, cabarets, nightclubs, cinemas and theaters. These venues and activities are often accompanied by the serving and drinking of alcoholic beverages in addition to non-alcoholic drinks for the family. Nightlife venues often require a cover charge for admission.

Ponce is better known for its cultural, artistic and educational heritage and attributes than for its commerce and heavy industry. "Its urban center has transformed from one with numerous daytime commercial premises to an area of nighttime activity and restaurants with varied musical, gastronomical and cultural offerings." As such, Ponce's nightlife also offers many venues and events oriented towards families and children in addition to adult-only and the night owl entertainment. Its two major areas of nightlife activity are the historic downtown zone and the sea-front La Guancha complex.

== Social and regulatory aspects ==
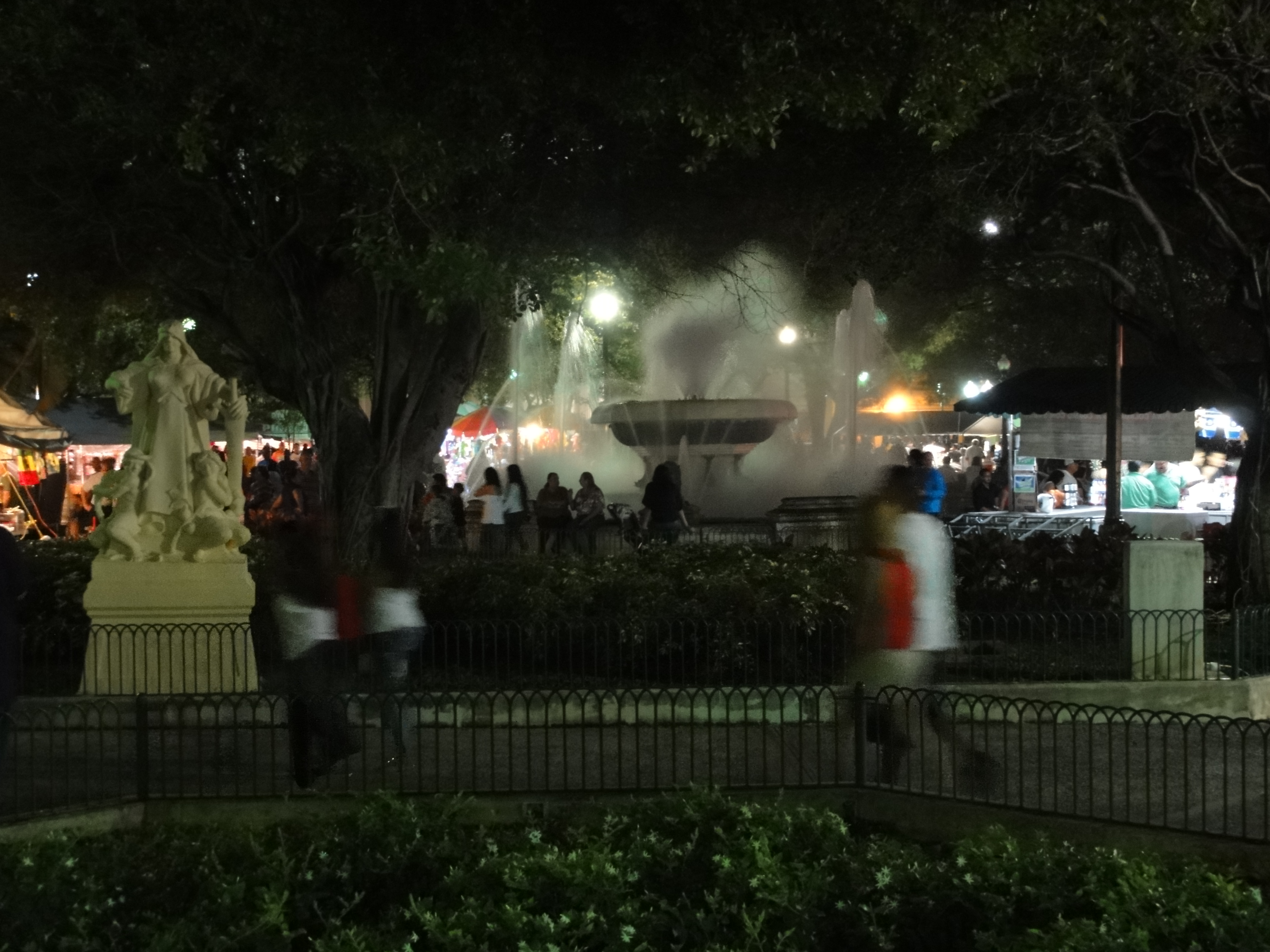
Fuente de los leones at Plaza Degetau, a popular nighttime gathering spot

Adult nightlife establishments in Ponce, like pubs, bars and nightclubs, function as third places. Vibrant Ponce nightlife scenes contribute to the development of a local culture. Some nightlife establishments in the city require adherence to a dress code. Though mostly true of nightclubs, one notable case is Proscenium, a café theater in Barrio Tercero, at the corner of Calle Marina and Calle Isabel, across from Plaza Muñoz Rivera in the downtown district.

Until 17 October 2005, there was no national or municipality-mandated last call for purchase of alcoholic beverages in the city of Ponce. There were also no mandated hours of operation for liquor stores. On 17 October, however, Municipal Law #24 went into effect establishing a 3:00AM (Monday through Wednesday) and a 3:30AM (Thursday through Sunday) last calls. Drinking on the street is legal, except in the Downtown historic district and the La Guancha sea-front recreational area. In any event, regardless of the 17 October 2005 ordinance, sales are prohibited on Election Day and during hurricane emergencies. Beer, wine and spirits are available for sale at Ponce supermarkets, convenience stores and drug stores as well as liquor stores. The minimum age for purchasing alcohol is 18 years; this is also the minimum drinking age. Nightlife venues must be licensed to serve alcohol.

Prostitution was legalized in Ponce in 1894 and was permitted until the late 1910s. In 1894, Mayor Nouvilas de Vilar issued an anti-prostitution edict, the Reglamento de Higiene de la Prostitución (Prostitution Higiene Decree), intended to "correct immorality in Ponce". Prostitutes had to register with the municipal government to operate, and had to pay a hygiene tax. This gave them the right to regular medical exams and access to a personal passbook certifying they had received a clean bill of health. Exercising prostitution without registering was charged as "trafficking in sex" without registration.

== Venues and events ==
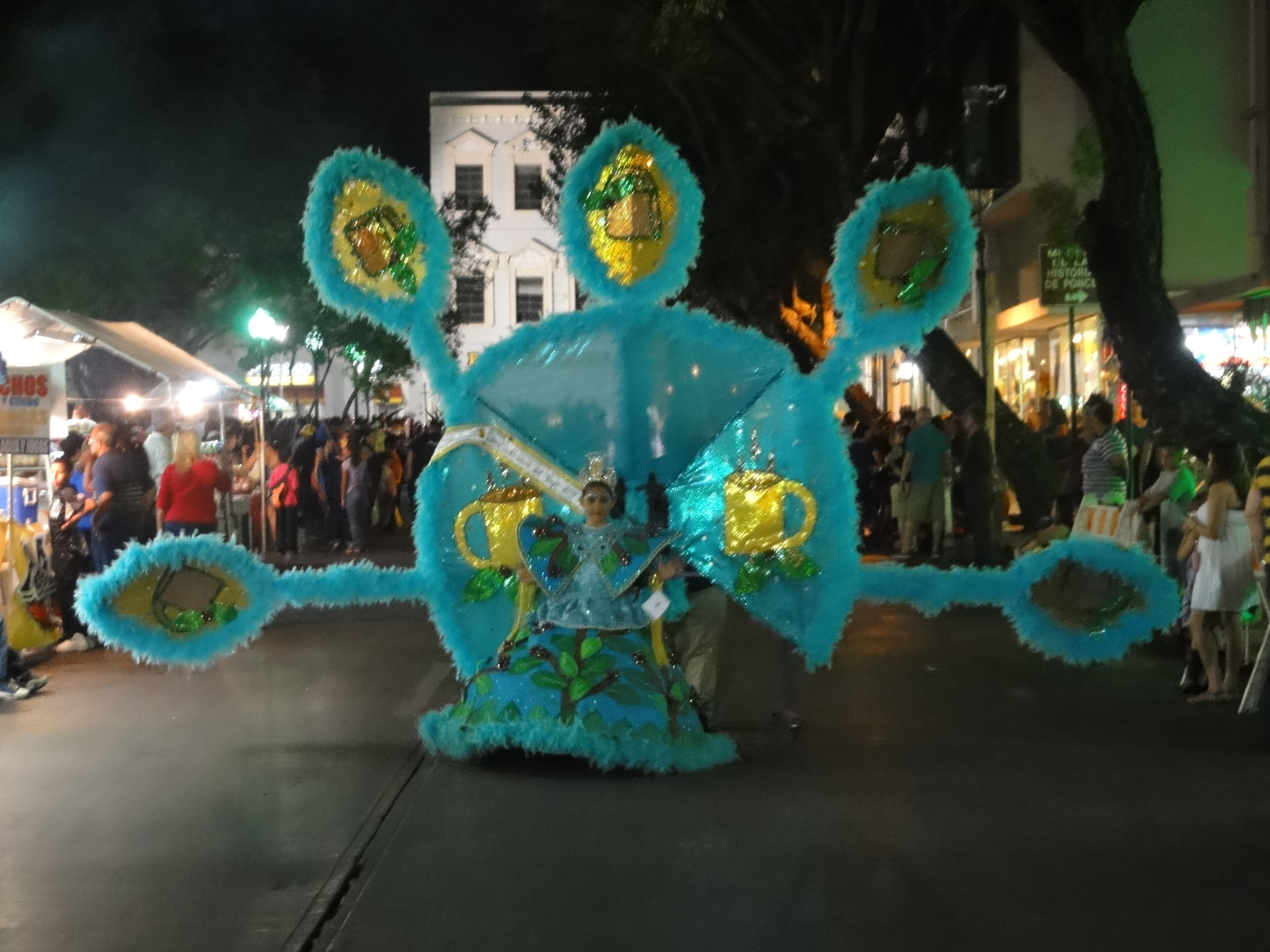
Carnaval de Ponce 2011

Ponce nightlife venues include places to go dancing, socialize over drinks, or watch a show or concert. Some nightlife venues, like those for theatrical arts at Teatro La Perla, are wholly indoors, while others, like those at La Guancha, are wholly or mostly outdoors. Still others, located mostly in the historic downtown area, are indoor venues that spill out onto the sidewalk, like CheCheColé on Calle Unión at Plaza Degetau. This "spilling over" onto the sidewalk is allowed, by permit, under city ordinance with certain conditions and restrictions.

Among the better known nighttime events are the week-long events of Las Justas, which attract some 200,000 to 300,000 visitors, Carnaval de Ponce, attracting some 100,000 attendees, and Fiestas Patronales. All three occur at nighttime, with the first two also having some daytime components. Most bars, lounges, and rooftops in the downtown area open late. Some, like Vistas (C. Marina and C. Cristina), also have good views of the city. For a more casual night on the town, tourists and locals alike often head to La Guancha, where multiple bars line facing the Caribbean Sea. As a college town, most of Ponce's nightlife comes alive on the weekends. Ponce nightlife also "boasts a younger crowd and more affordable drinks than the San Juan metro area." Some point to La Guancha as the spot with the best bars and restaurants in Ponce, along the sea front.

== Casinos, bars, pubs, and nightclubs ==
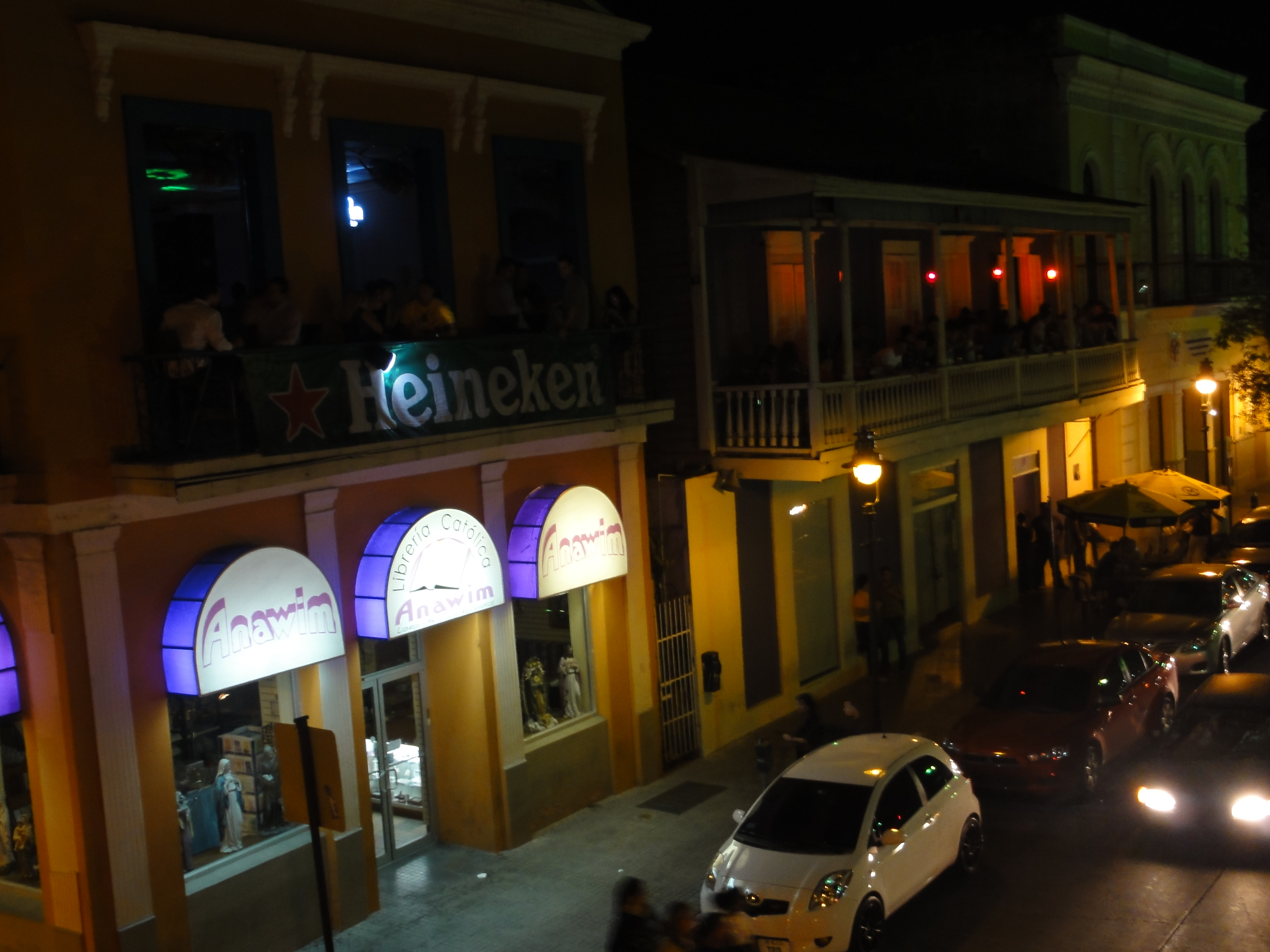
Two crowded second-floor downtown bars across Plaza Muñoz Rivera

External videos
- See people partying at Ponce's Linux Nightclub, here
- See a band at Ponce's 30,000-spectator La Guancha amphitheater, here
- See young people drinking and dancing during Ponce's Las Justas, here
- See young people clubbing during Ponce's Justas event, here
- See Ponce's Carnaval de Ponce, here

Ponce casinos are open 24/7 and include those at the Ponce Holiday Inn and Casino, the Ponce Hilton, and the Ponce Plaza Hotel & Casino. Of these three, only the Ponce Plaza Hotel & Casino is located in the historic district.

A variety of bars, pubs, and night clubs fill different tastes. Some of the more popular bars include local joints, but several chain restaurants also provide bar areas. Among bars are: La Musa Bar & Tapas (Callejón Amor), Baleares at Hotel Meliá (C. Cristina), Perla del Sur Bar and Grill (across Teatro La Perla), and Eleven Pub (C. Isabel). La Chucha Sports Bar is a sports bar with a unique offering (C. Isabel, between C. Leon y C. Mayor). There is also a bar with a dance floor at La Pulga (C. Virgilio Biaggi) and one at Linux nightclub (C. Unión). Also, while there is no designated LGBT nightlife scene, at least one LGBT organization had, in 2017, recognized the city's LGBT inclusiveness.

== College spring break ==
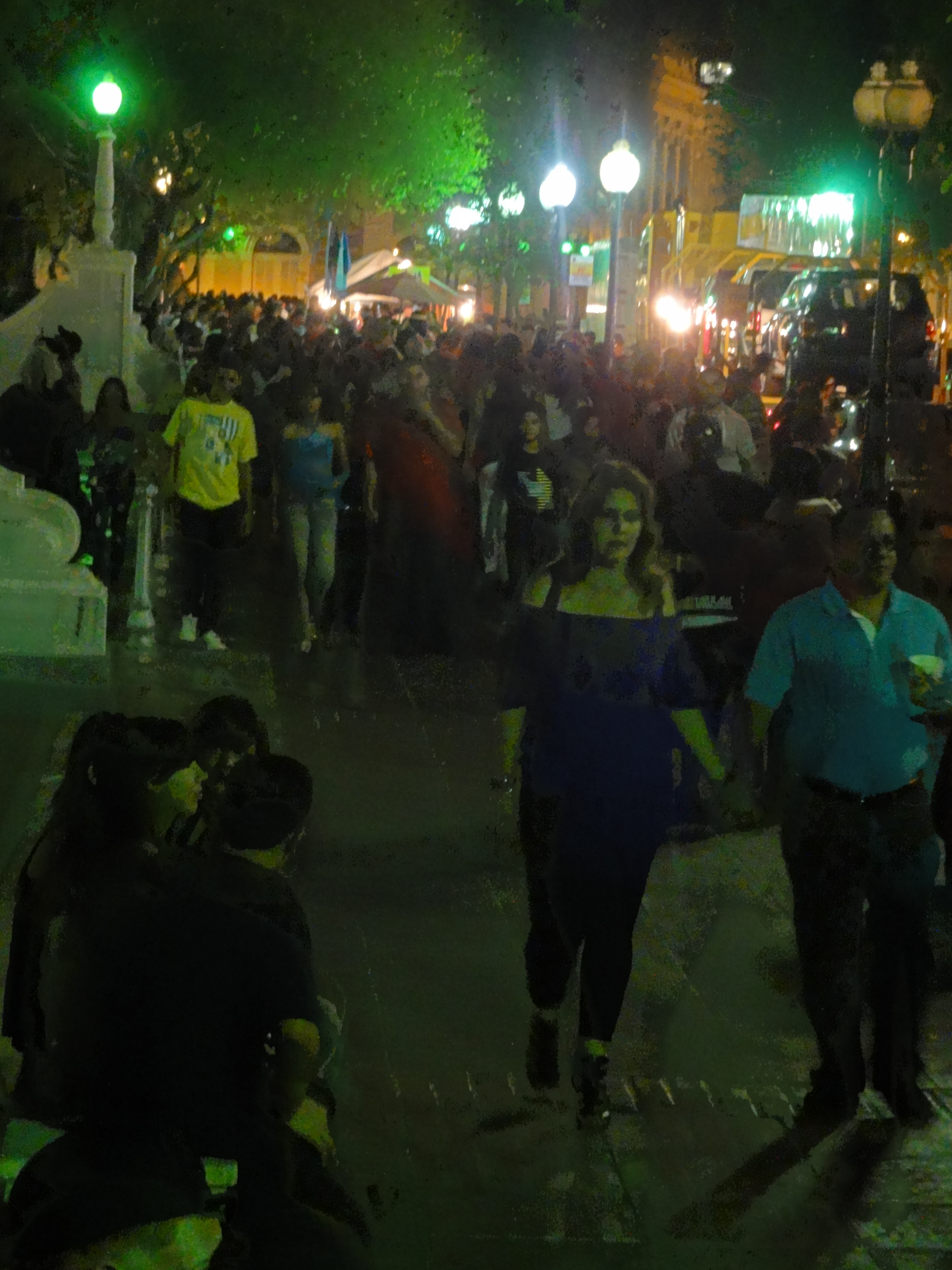
Las Justas 2018 at Plaza Las Delicias

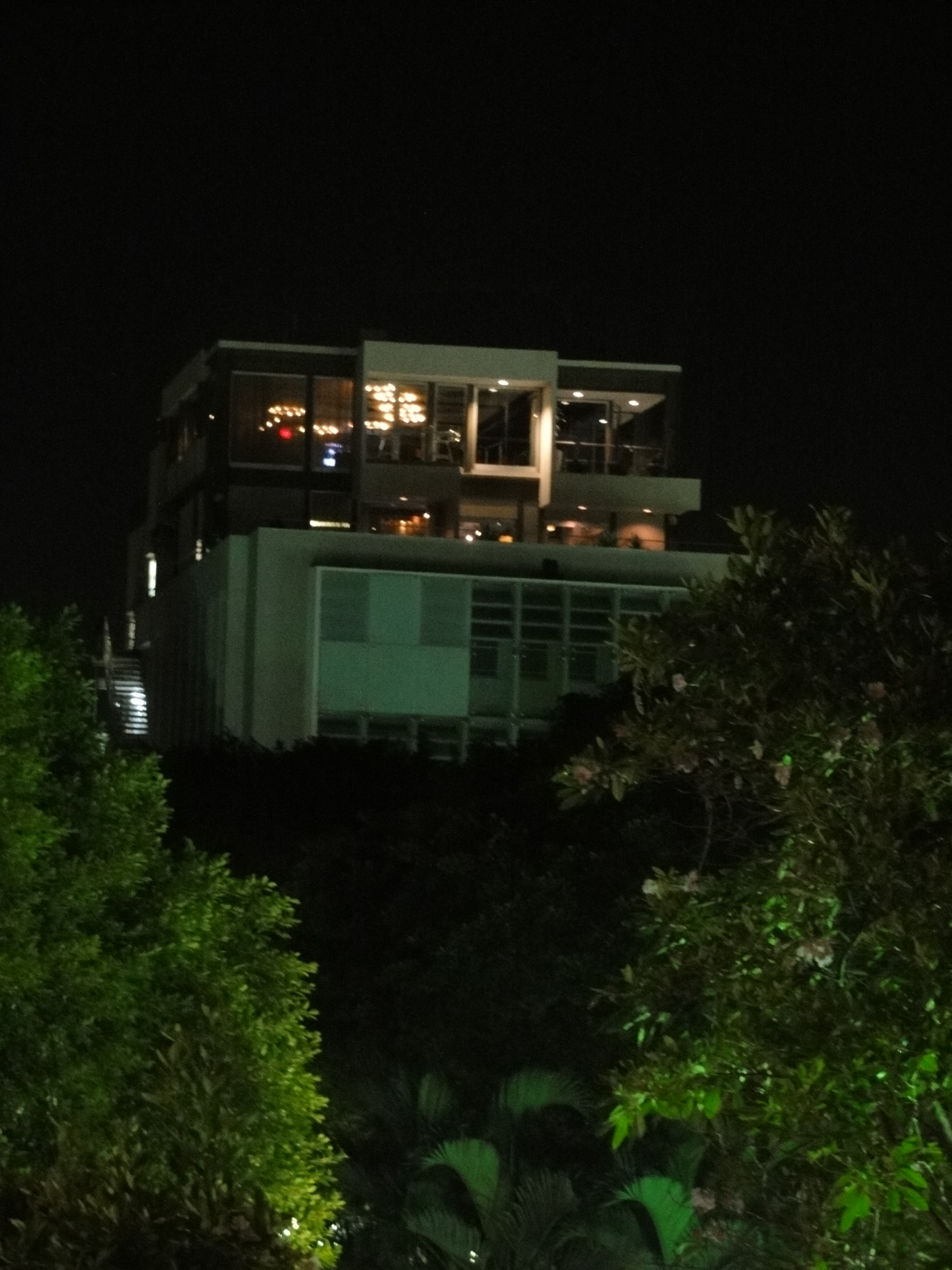
Rooftop 'Vistas' cocktail lounge, from where a view of Ponce's nightlife can be appreciated, rises above Plaza Muñoz Rivera

Las Justas are an intercollegiate group of events that bring thousands of college-aged students to the downtown area at nighttime after full daytime sports competitions in Ponce area sports venues. Las Justas lasts one week and take place during the month of April.

With over 200,000 college students attending Las Justas every year, security has been a major concern. In 2010, for example, 13 people were arrested for drug activities during the events. Las Justas, it is said, has evolved into a Puerto Rican-style Spring Break. Close to 1,500 security personnel patrol the event for security. A number of items are not permitted in the areas where activities of Las Justas are celebrated, including both sporting events and associated musical celebrations. Coolers, liquids not in their original containers, glass bottles, umbrellas, baseball bats, canes, and fire arms are some of the items that are excluded. In 2012, Enrique Arrarás Mir, the Commissioner of the event, said that “the safest place in all of Puerto Rico during the celebration of Las Justas will be the city of Ponce”. In 2011, in Mayaguez, there were also arrests for drunkenness and drug trafficking. In 2014, electronic scanners were implemented at checkpoints, doing away with the former and slower manual frisk system.

== Family-oriented events ==
La Guancha is a venue for socializing, informal outdoor dancing, listening to live bands and even karaokeing on the seafront. Concha Acústica de Ponce is an open-air amphitheater that has hosted from the classical music of Banda Municipal de Ponce to the swift rhythms of Ponce Jazz Festival groups. Teatro La Perla is a historic indoors venue known for its live shows as well as its classical music performances and stand-up comedies.

Las Mañanitas is a family oriented event that takes place every year on December 12 in the wee hours of the morning. Fiestas patronales take place during the second week of December at the downtown Plaza Las Delicias. Carnaval Ponceño has evening and late night events with live music during the week of lent, either in February or March. The Ponce Jazz Festival is another event that has taken place the last few years with live performances at Concha Acústica de Ponce.

Noches de Placita (transl. Nights of Placita) held its seventh event in July 2018 and celebrated its one-year anniversary on 29 November 2019. The event takes place at Plaza 65 de Infantería in Barrio Playa on the last Friday of every month.

== Gallery ==
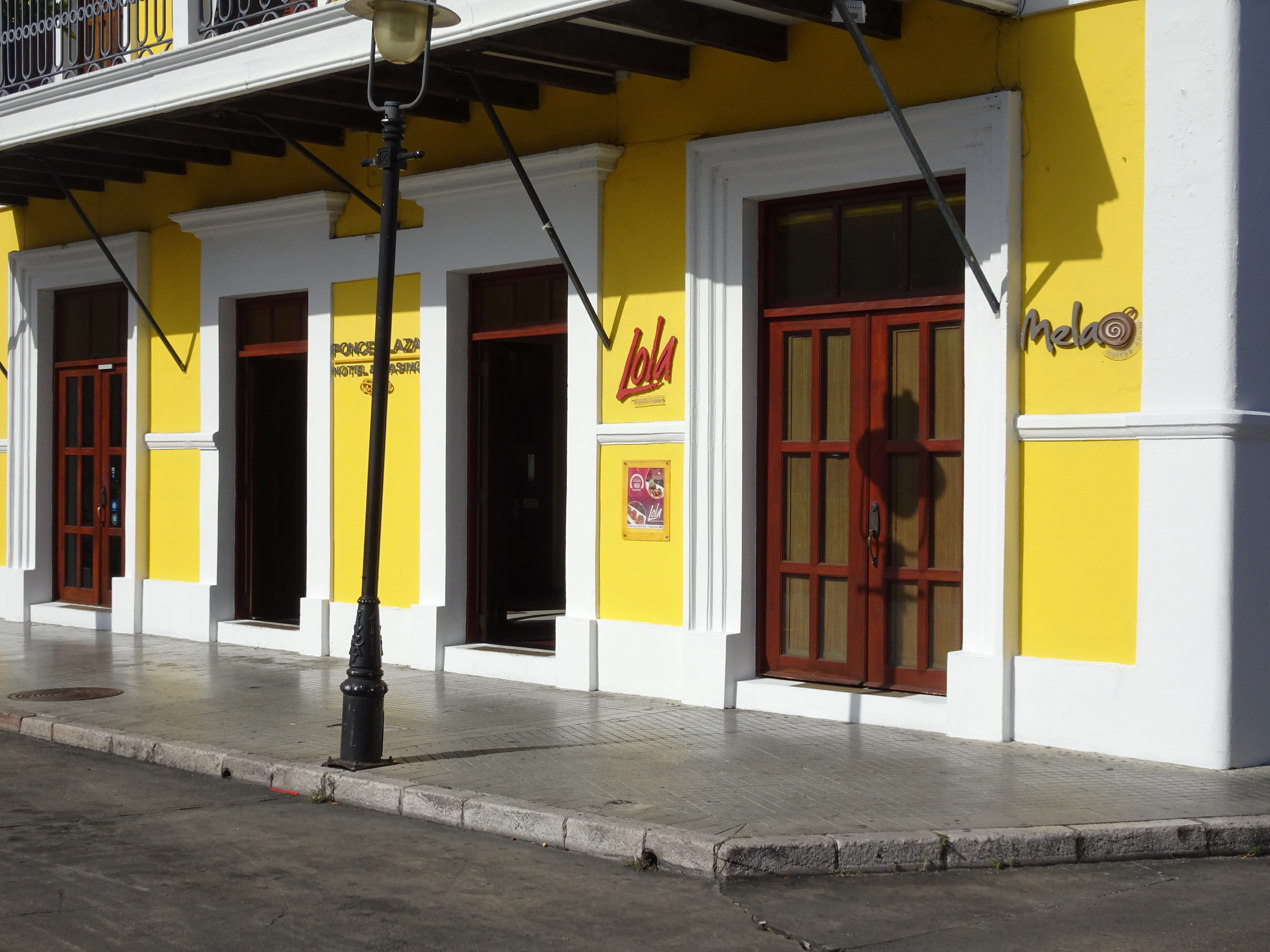
Casino and bar at the Ponce Plaza Hotel & Casino

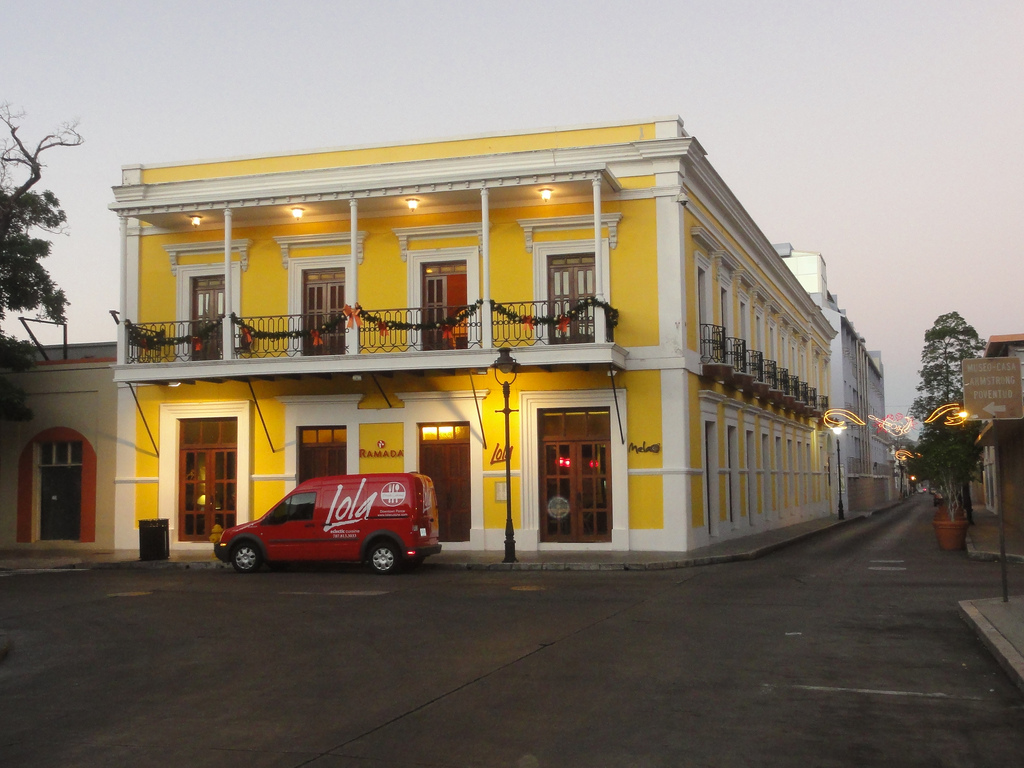
Casino at Ponce Plaza Hotel on Calle Unión and Plaza Las Delicias

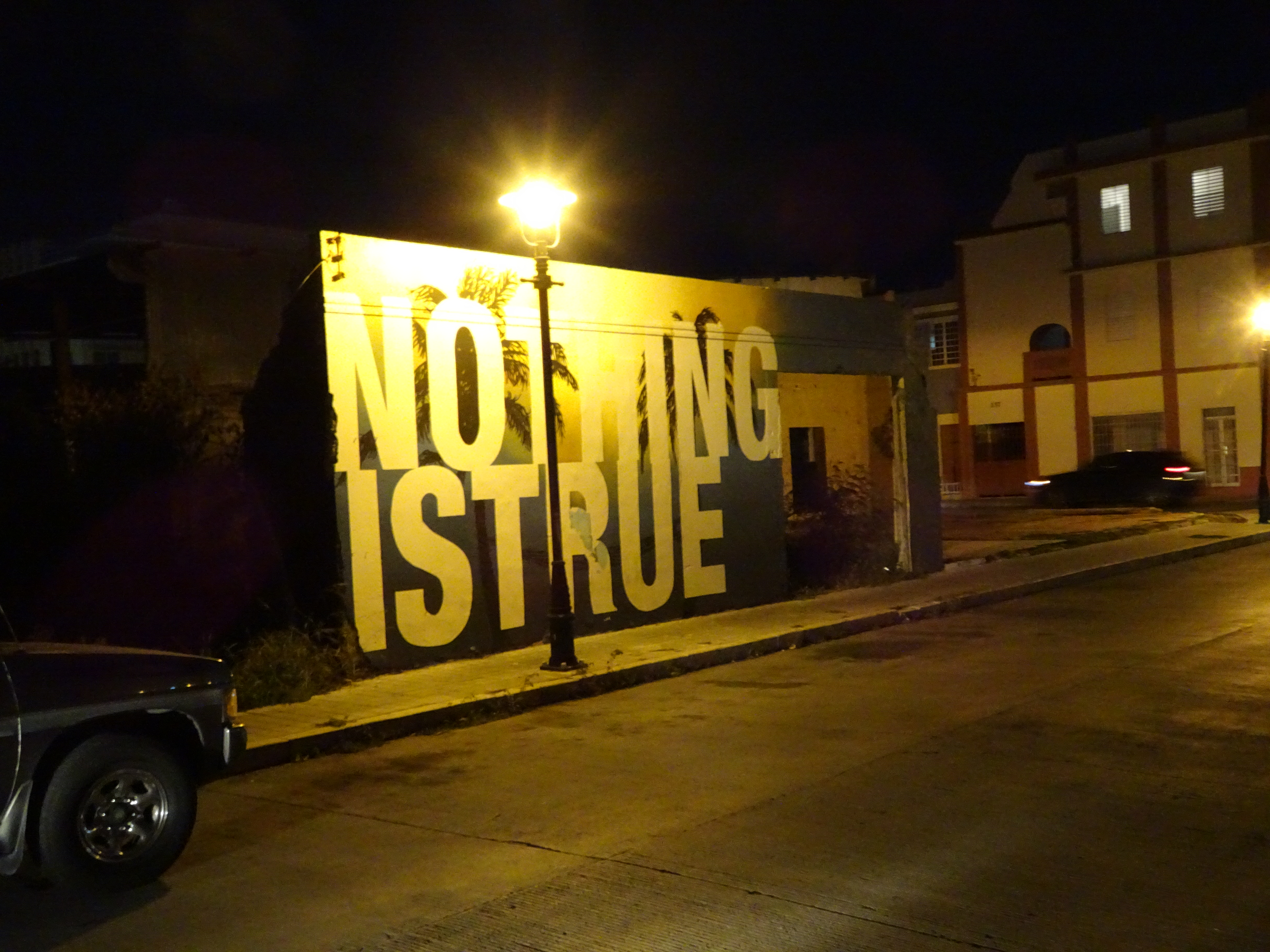
Nighttime in the city

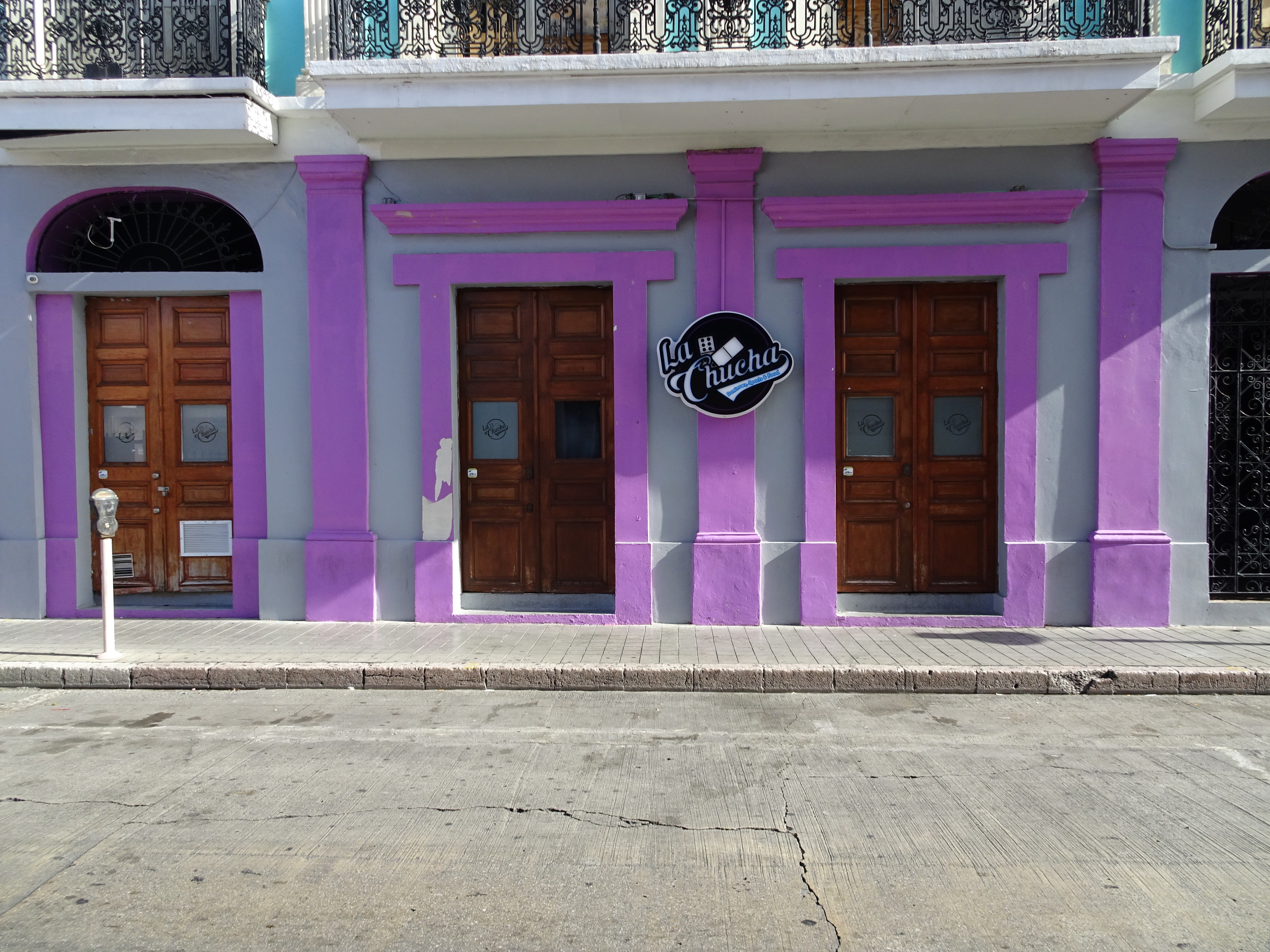
Sports bar on Calle Isabel

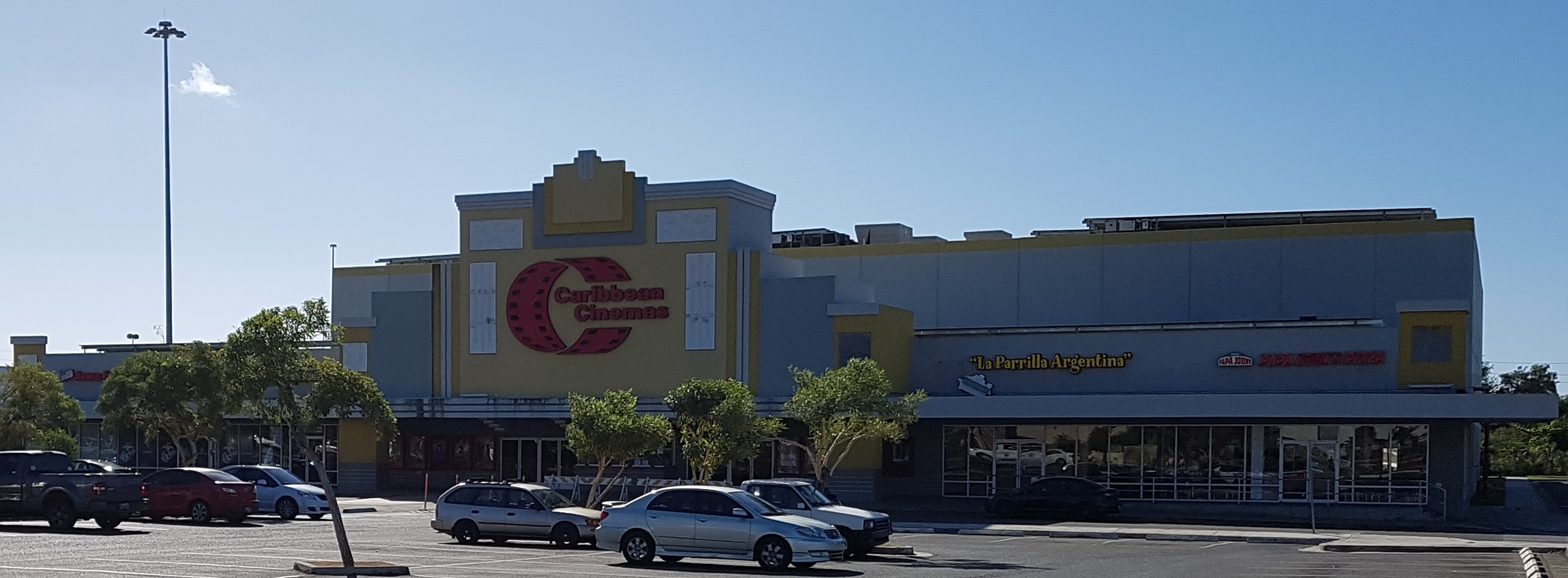
Cinema houses near Plaza del Caribe mall

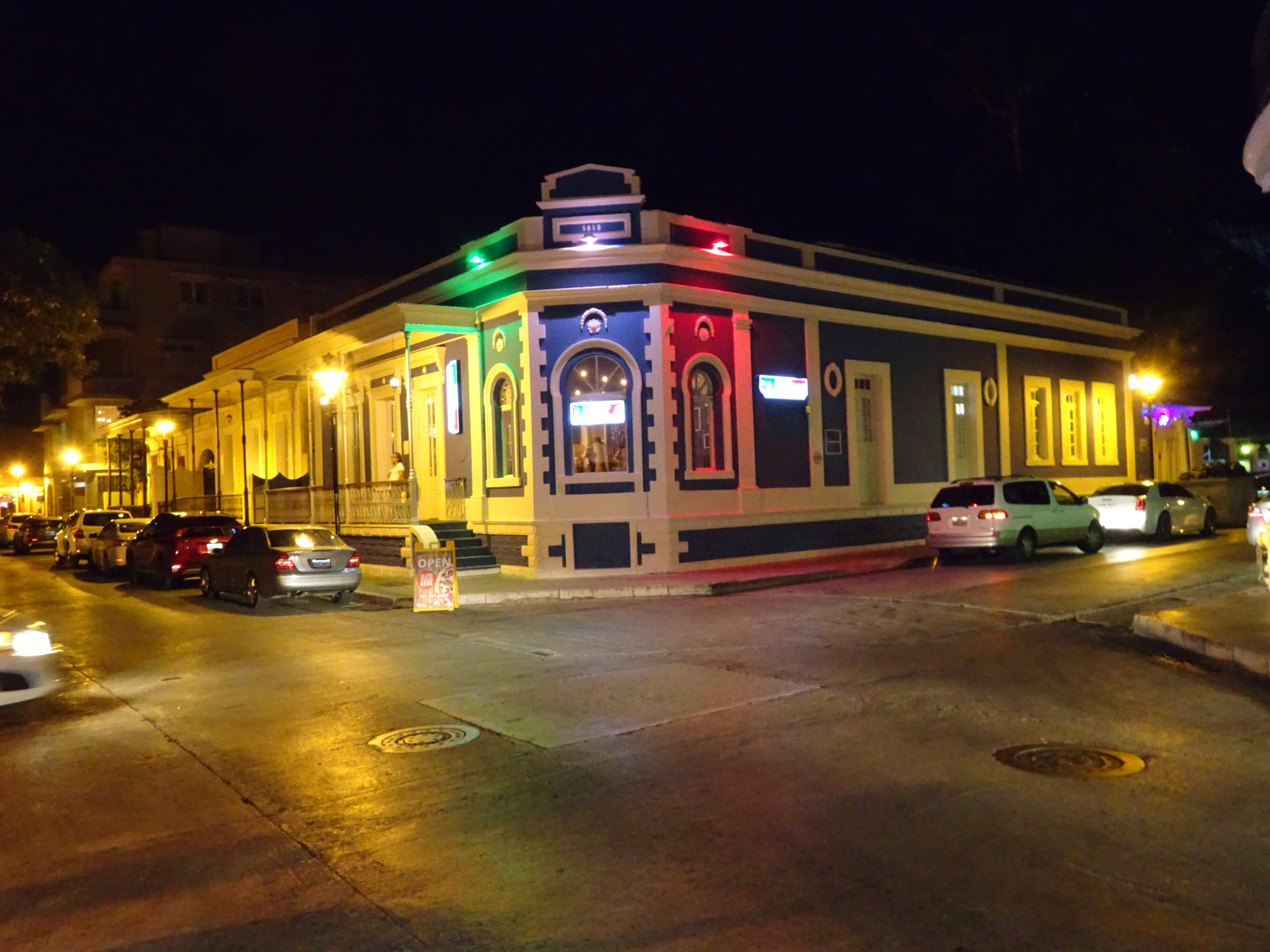
A nightlife scene in Ponce during a week night

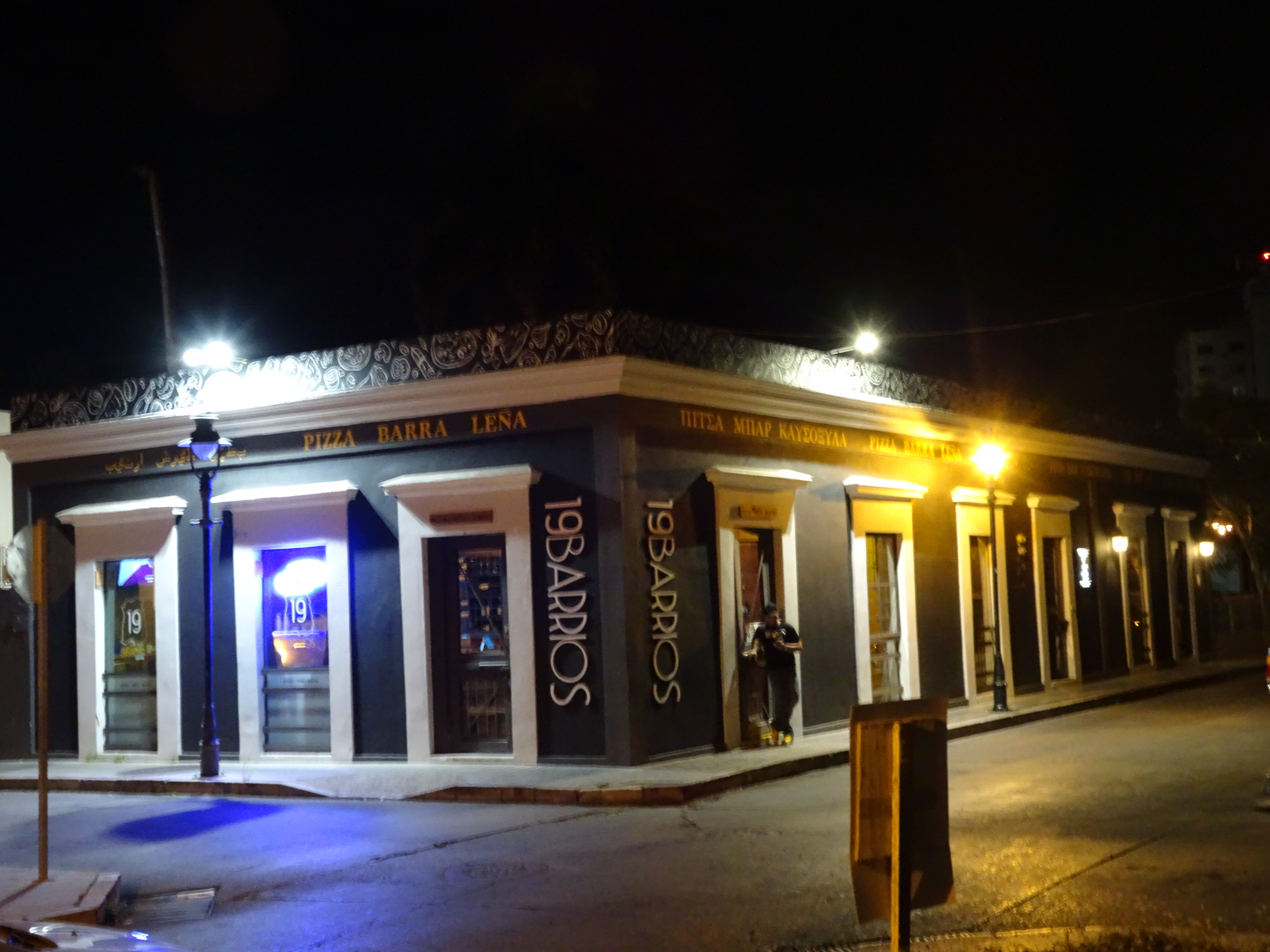
A bouncer stands guard outside a downtown Ponce lounge

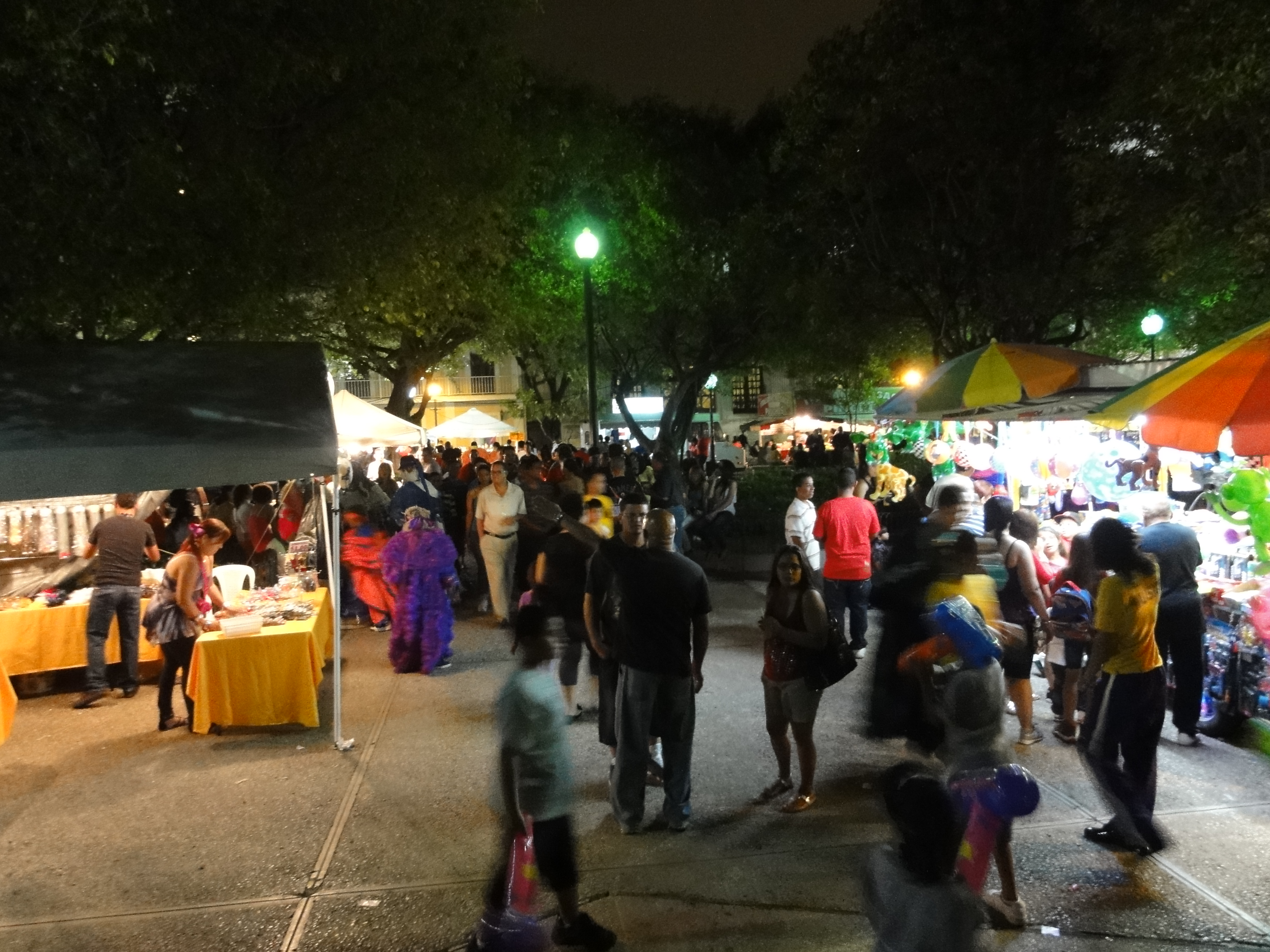
Feria de Artesanías de Ponce 2018, Plaza Las Delicias

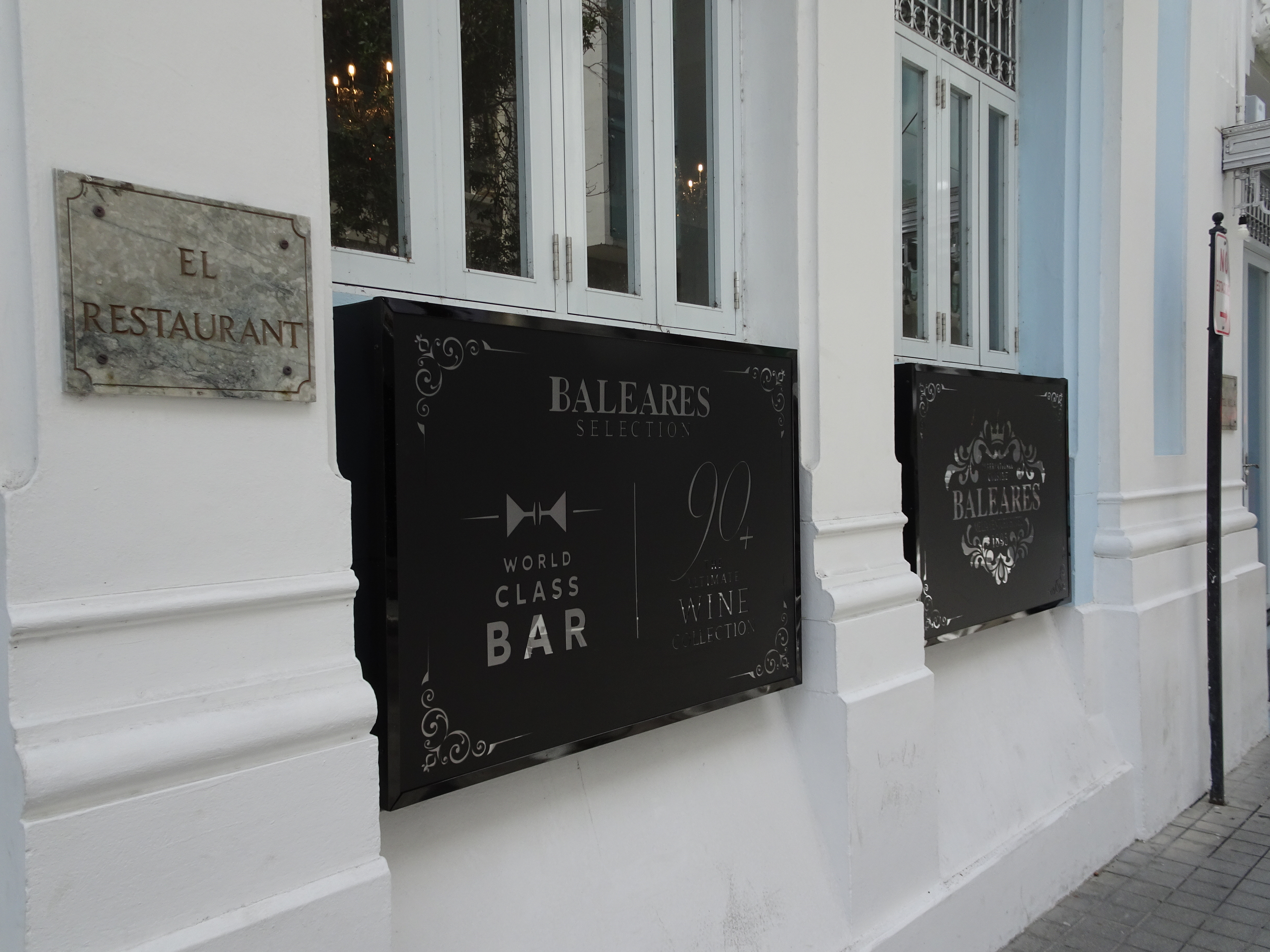
Baleares bar at Hotel Meliá

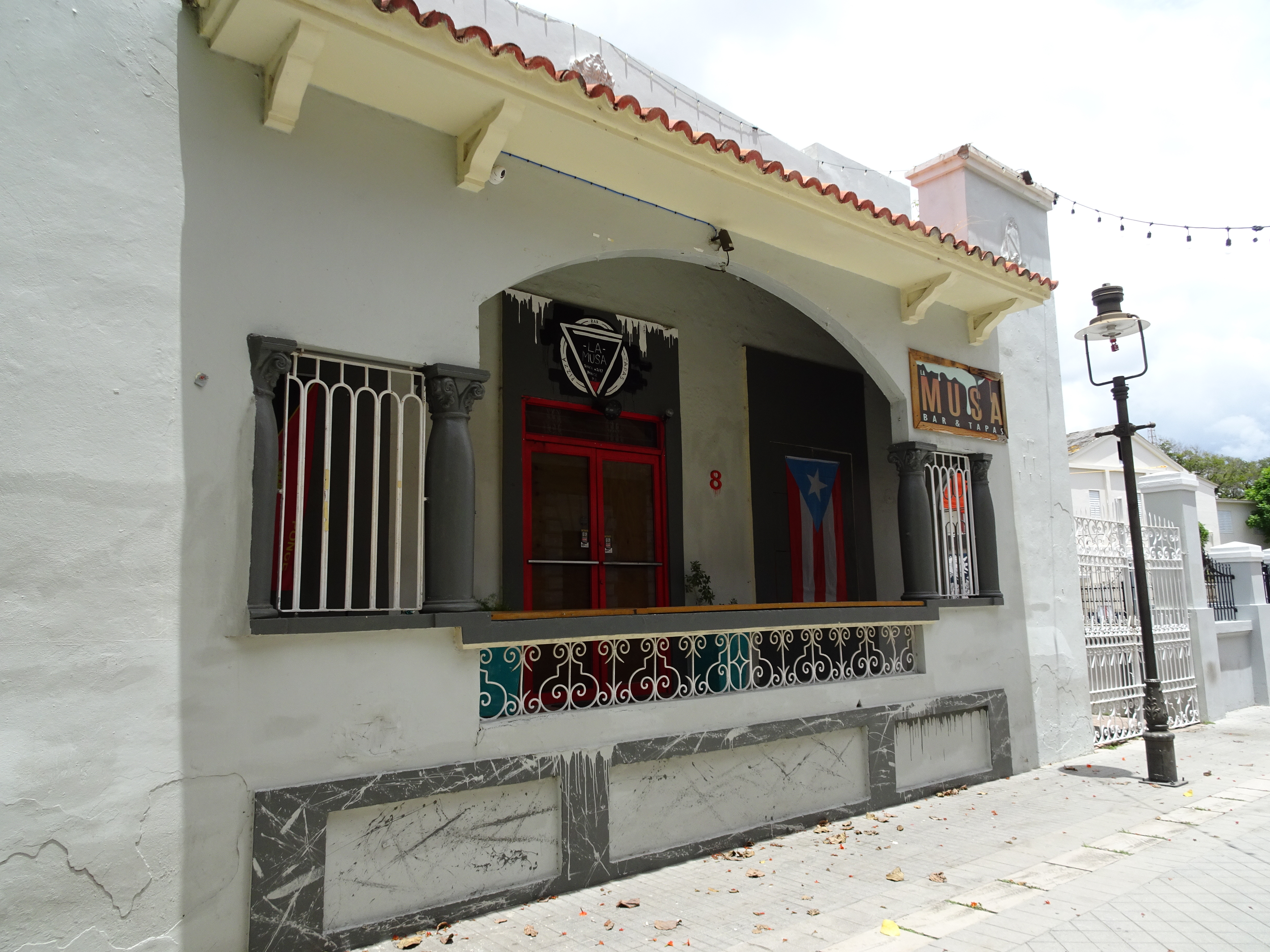
La Musa Bar and Grill at Callejón Amor

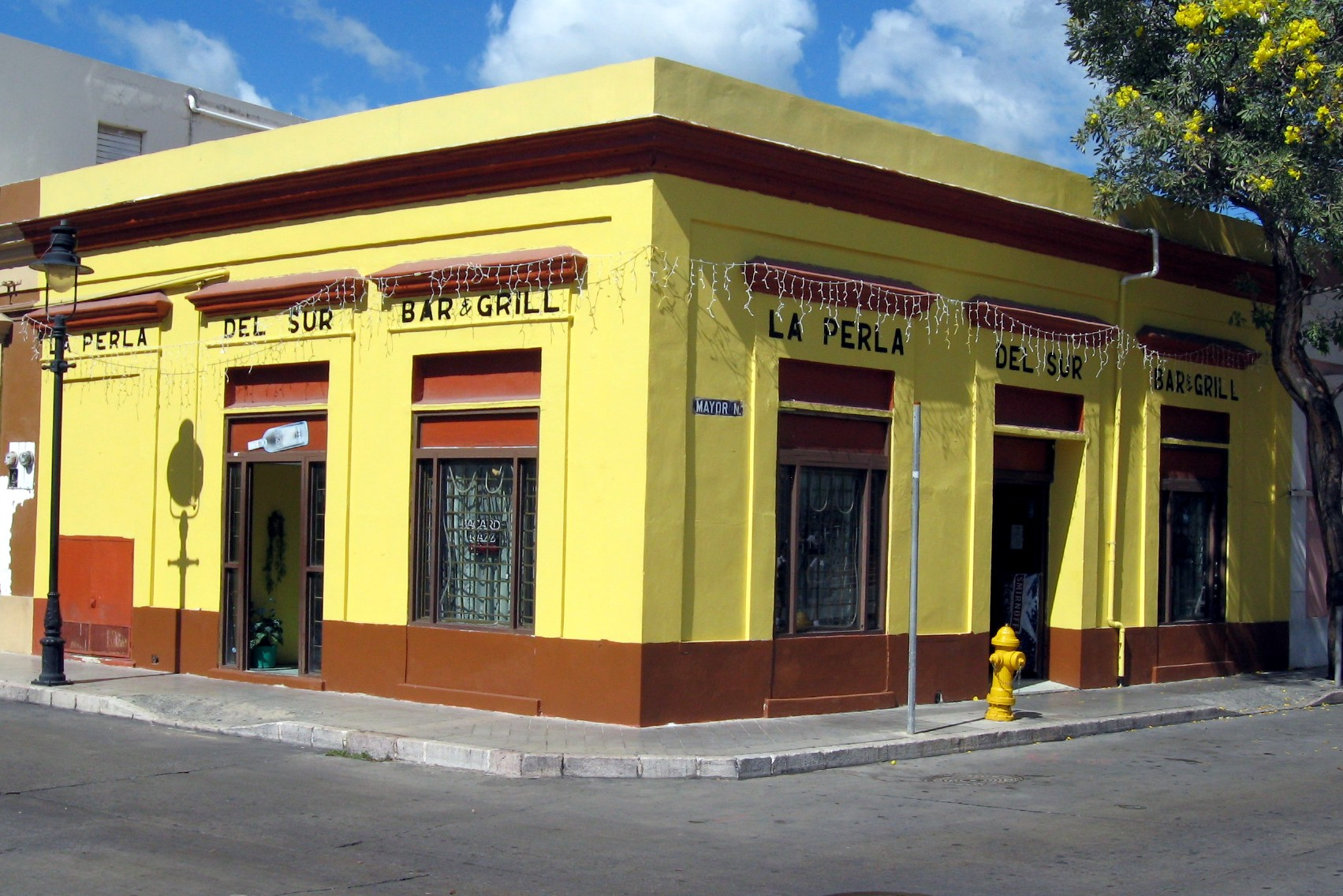
Bar and grill

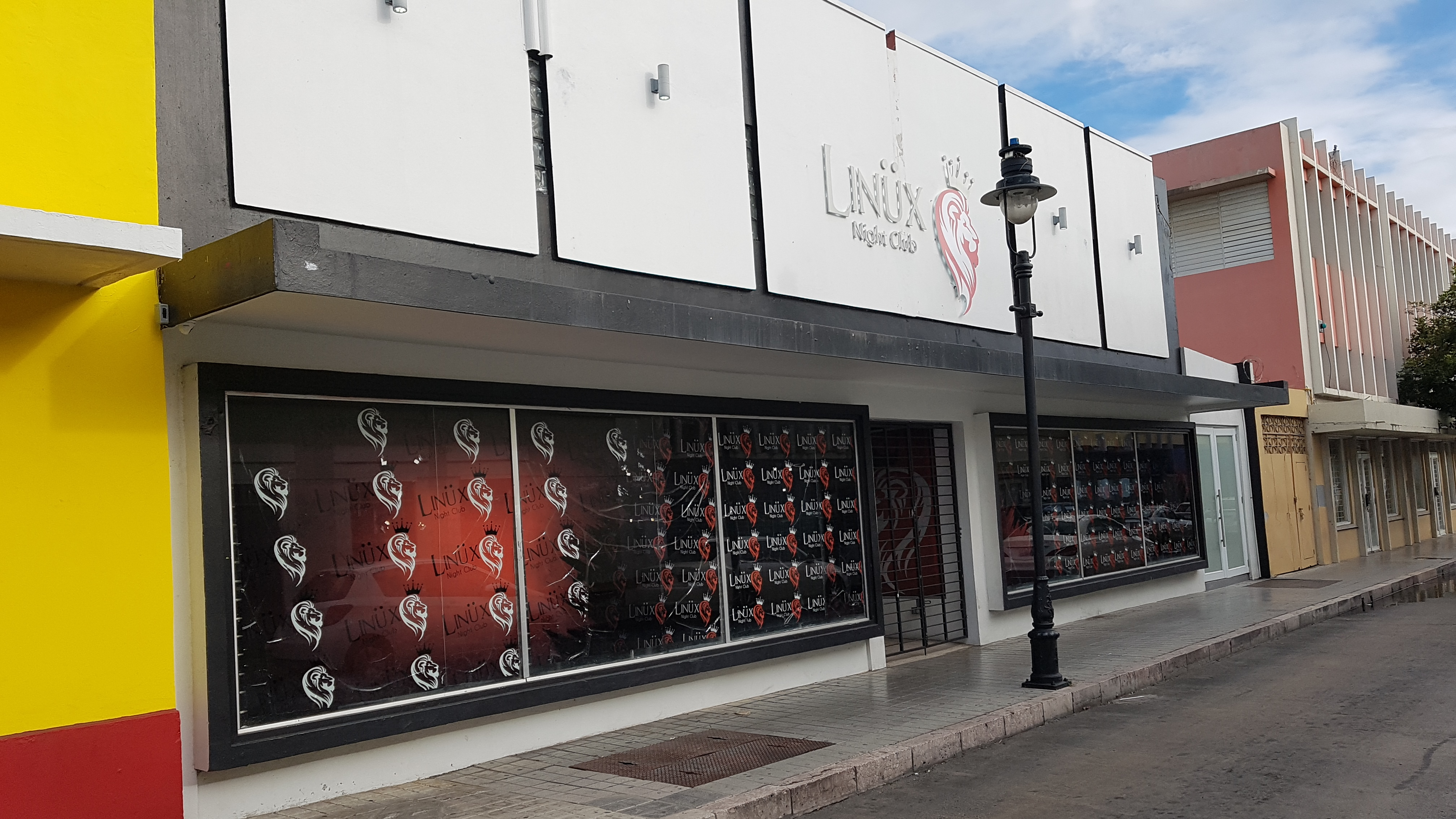
Linux Night Club on Calle Unión

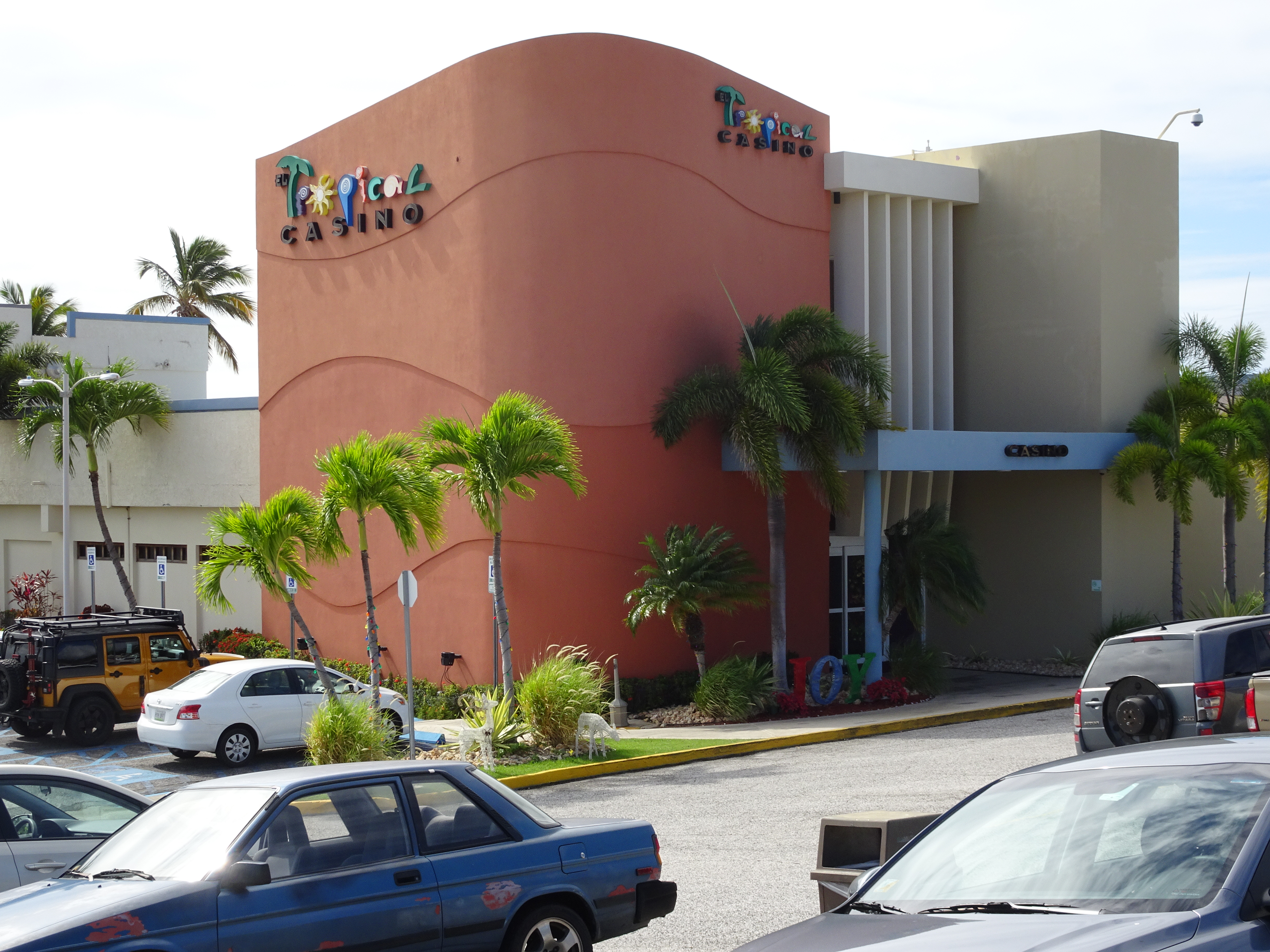
Tropical Casino

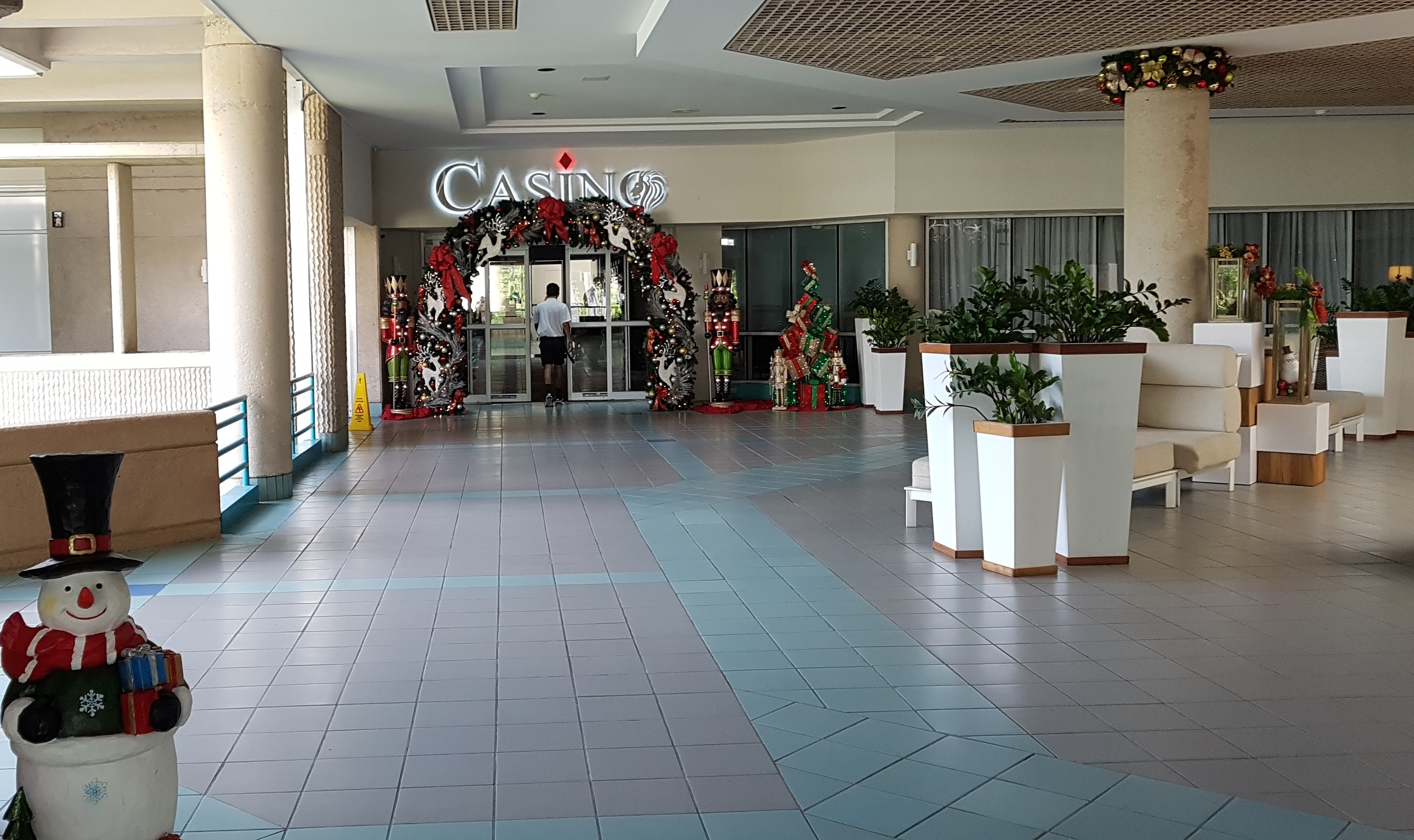
Ponce Hilton Casino

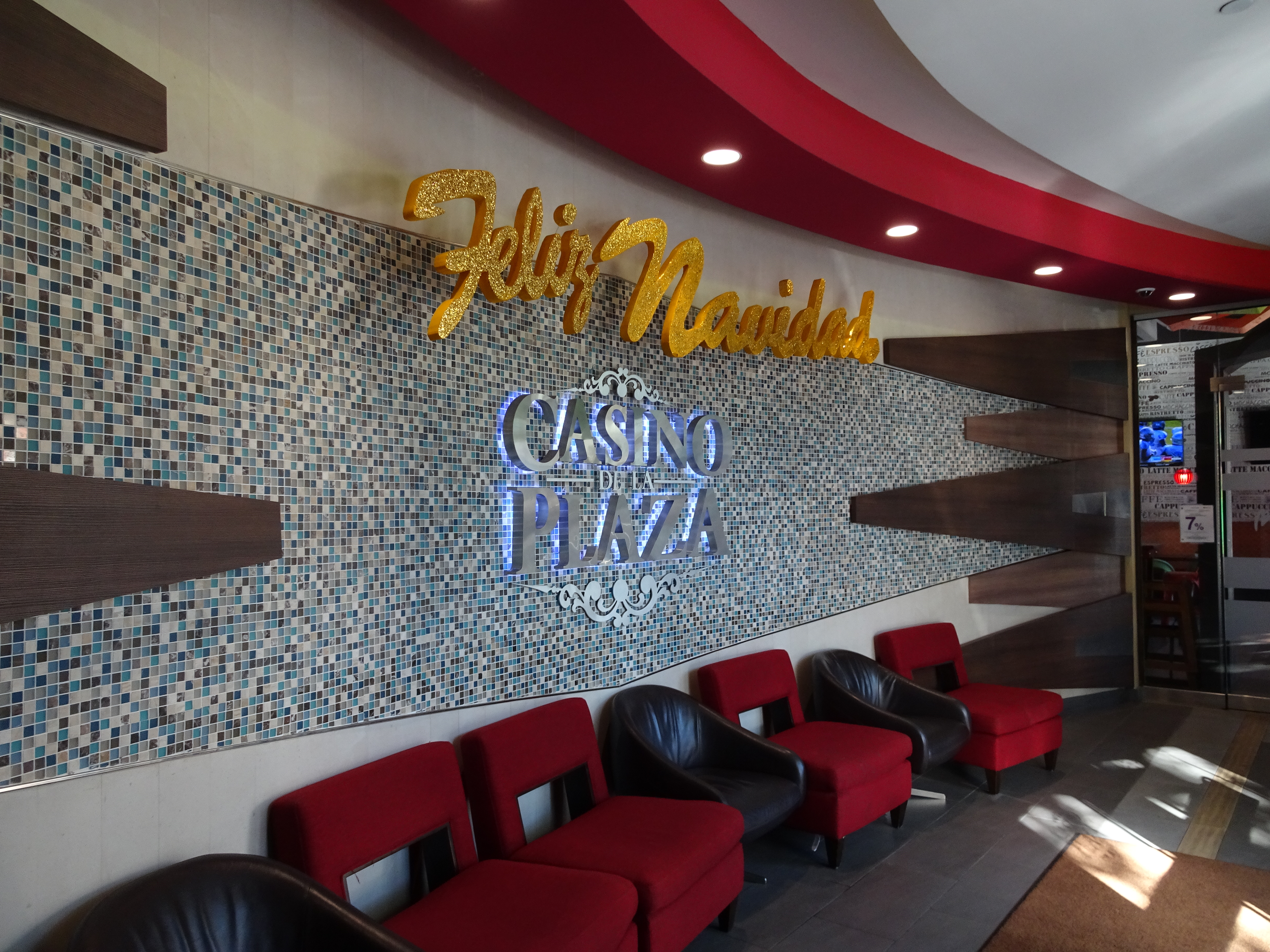
Casino at the Ponce Plaza Hotel

== See also ==
- List of events in Ponce, Puerto Rico
- Porta Caribe
