= Concha Acústica de Ponce =

Open-air theater and music venue in Ponce, Puerto Rico

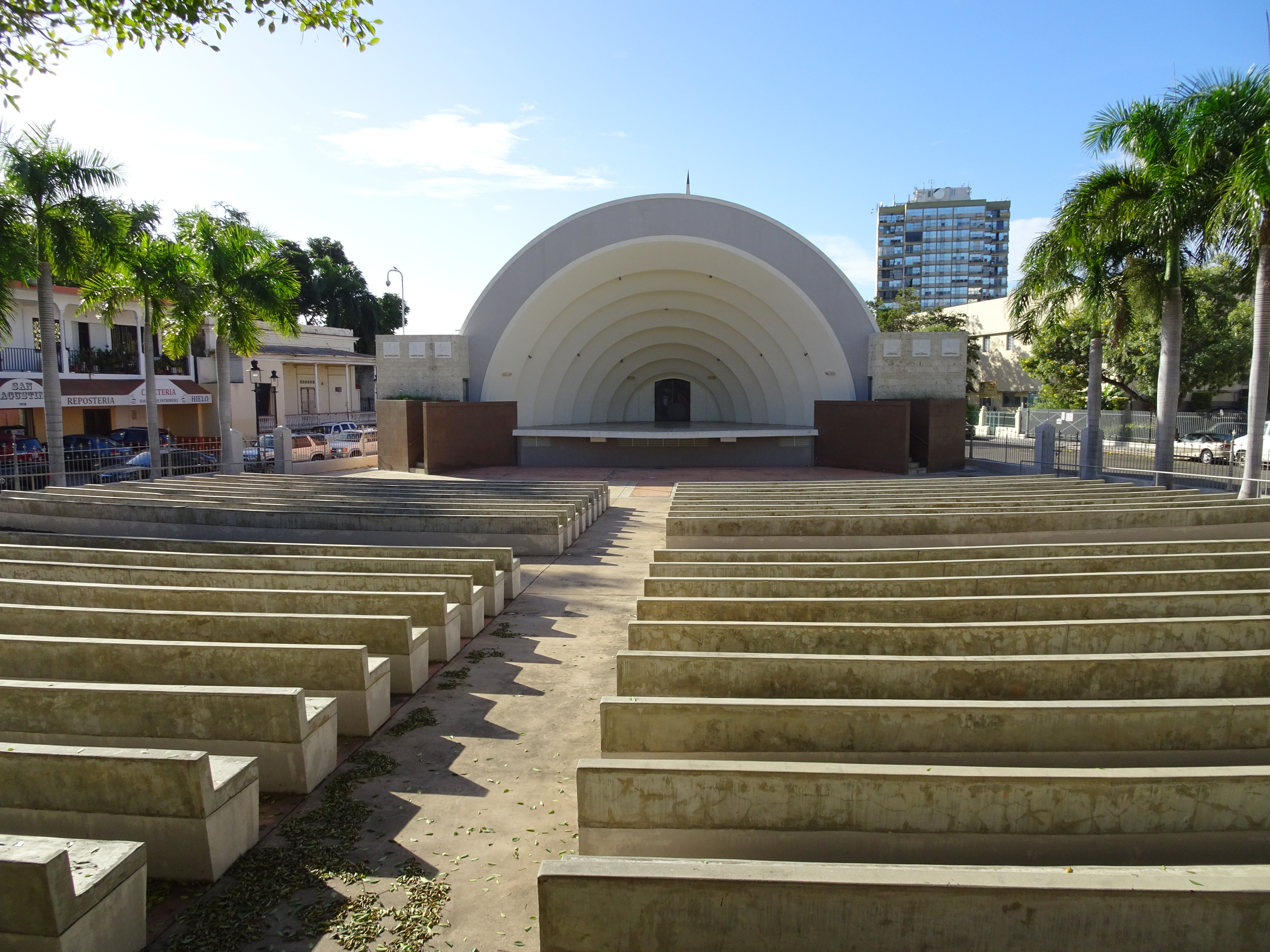
- Concha Acústica de Ponce, seen from the seating area
- Interactive map of Concha Acústica de Ponce
- Former names: Teatro del Parque de la Abolicion
- Address: Marina and Salud Streets
- Location: Ponce, Puerto Rico
- Coordinates: 18°00′22.7874″N 66°36′45.7914″W
- Owner: Municipality of Ponce
- Seating type: Concrete benches; lawn area
- Capacity: 2,000
- Type: Amphitheatre
- Events: musical, performing arts, cultural

Construction
- Built: 1956
- Opened: 1956

Website
- www.visitponce.com

Concha Acústica de Ponce (English: Ponce Acoustic Shell) is an open-air music and performing arts amphitheater venue in Barrio Cuarto, Ponce, Puerto Rico, owned and managed by the Ponce Municipal Government. It is located on the grounds of Parque de la Abolición. The open-air auditorium-amphitheater is used primarily for cultural events. It is open from Monday through Friday, 8:00AM to 4:30PM. Concha Acústica, as it is known today (2017), is the result of a 1956 redesign that also included the adjacent Monumento a la abolición de la esclavitud. The original design was augmented by this 1956 redesign/renovation by Francisco Porrata-Doría (1890–1971).

== Location and features ==
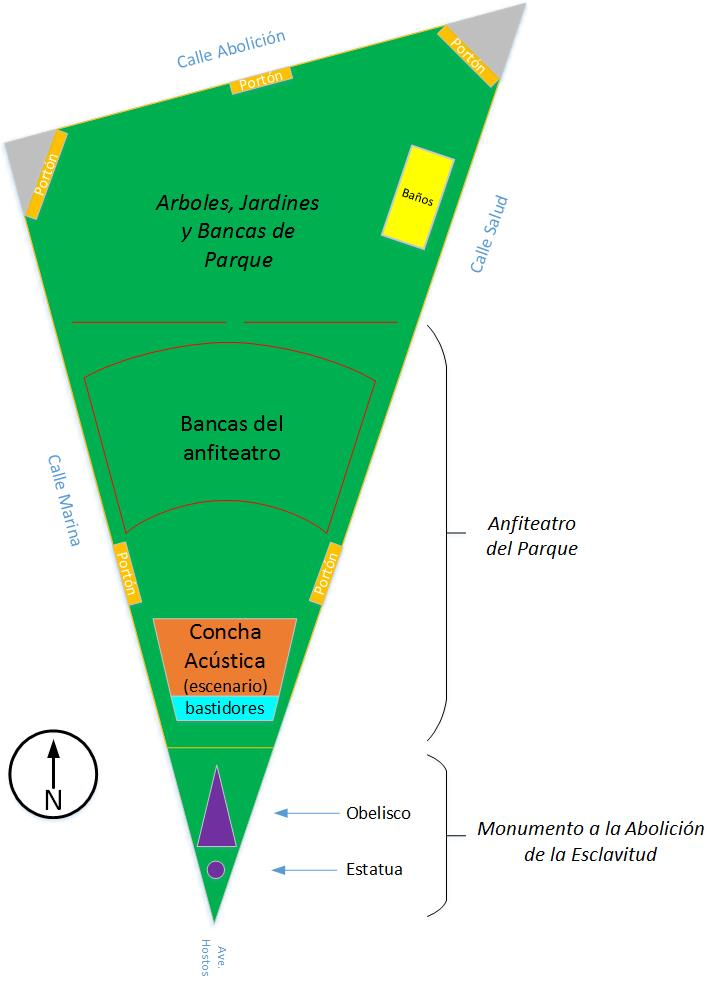
Map of Parque de la Abolición showing location of the Concha Acústica amphitheater

The amphitheater is located on Avenida Hostos at the fork of Salud Street and Marina Street. It is immediately north of the obelisk commemorating the abolition of slavery, Monumento a la abolición de la exclavitud. Together with the obelisk and the park's shady green lawn area on its north end, Concha Acústica completes the park as a triangular city block. Seating on long concrete benches can accommodate 2,000 audience members.

The two marble sides of the stage are adorned with six relief sculptures for the six sons of Ponce that have excelled in the musical arts. There are three marble sculptures on each side. On the left side are the sculptures of Juan Morel Campos, Manuel G. Tavarez, and Arístides Chavier; on the right side are those of Antonio Paoli, Julio C. Arteaga, and Juan Ríos Ovalle.

== History ==
In 1874, a year after the abolition of slavery, a group of citizens built a small monument in memory of the historic event. In 1880 Olimpio Otero, Juan Mayoral Barnés, and Román Baldorioty de Castro were instrumental in formalizing the concept for a park dedicated to the commemorating the abolition of slavery in Puerto Rico. Juan Mayoral Barnés brought the idea for the creation of the park to the Ponce Municipal Assembly on 14 March 1880. It was unanimously approved by the Assembly, ratified by the Central Government, and confirmed by Royal Decree on 1 March 1881.

The entire triangular area where Concha Acústica now stands was initially only a passive park with green spaces for lawn, flowers, and shade trees. This was the park built in the 1890s. Concha Acústica itself was built in 1956 under the administration of Ponce mayor Andrés Grillasca Salas on part of the same space occupied by the existing park. The architect of the structure was Francisco Porrata Doria, an architect from Ponce.

== Uses ==
Concha Acústica has seen numerous uses throughout the years. On a regular basis, the open-air auditorium has also been used for presentations by the Ponce Municipal Band and the Ponce Jazz Festival.

== See also ==
- List of theaters in Ponce, Puerto Rico
