= El Hombre Redimido =

Statue that commemorates the abolition of slavery in Puerto Rico

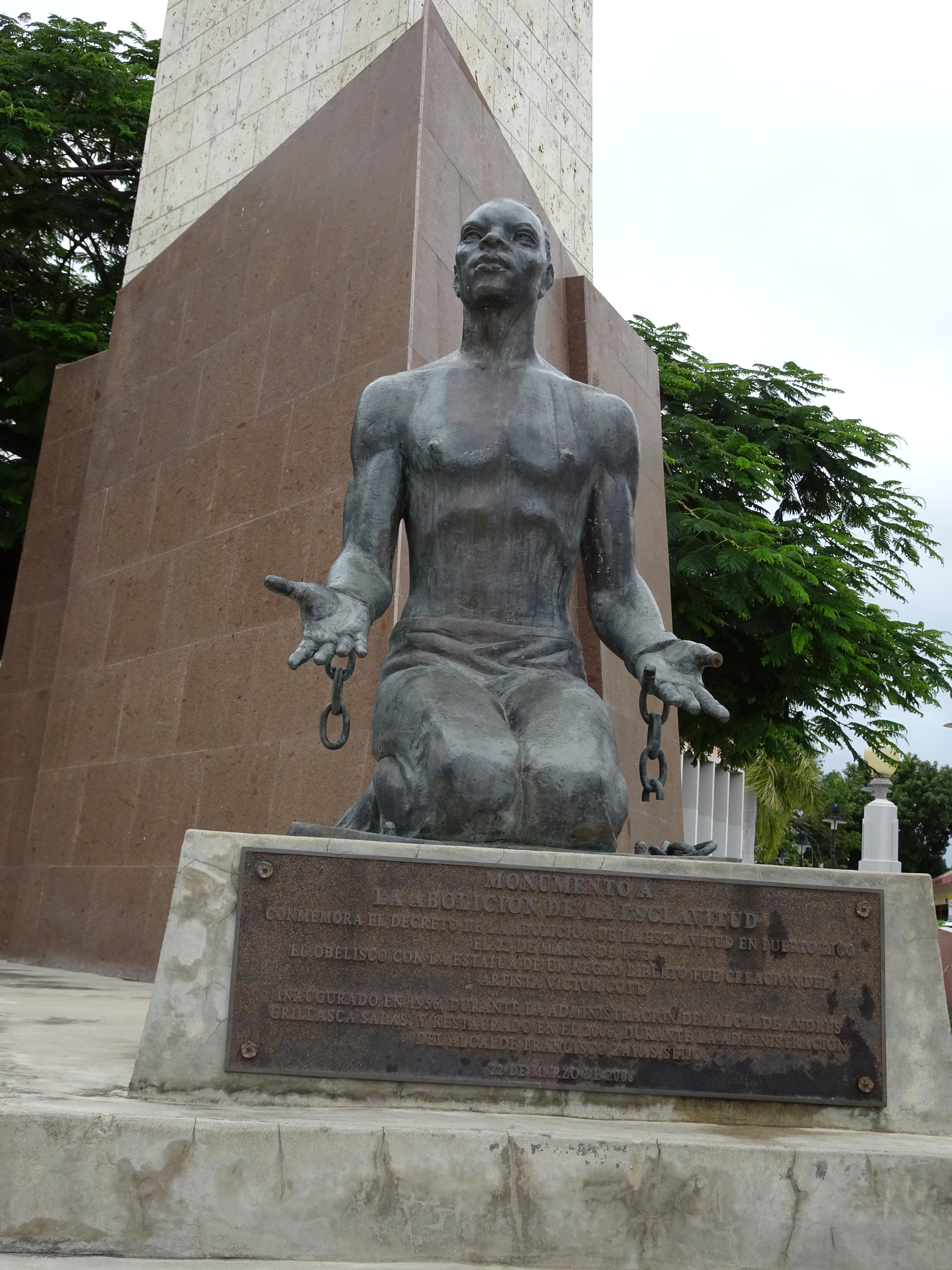

- Location of the statue within Puerto Rico
- Artist: Victor Cott
- Year: 1956
- Type: Bronze
- Medium: Bronze sculpture
- Subject: Freed slave man
- Dimensions: 120 cm (48 in)
- Condition: Pristine
- Location: Ponce, Puerto Rico; 18°0′21.276″N 66°36′45.864″W
- Owner: Municipality of Ponce, PR

El Hombre Redimido (English: Man redeemed) is a bronze statue by Victor Cott that commemorates the abolition of slavery in Puerto Rico. It is located on Avenida Hostos at the fork of Calle Salud and Calle Marina streets, in Barrio Cuarto, Ponce, Puerto Rico.

== Background ==
Slaves were brought to Puerto Rico from Africa starting in 1513 and through the 18th century to replace the local native "Indian" slaves who had been decimated. The new slaves worked the coffee, sugar cane, and gold mining industries in Puerto Rico. During the 18th century, as gold mining ceased to be one of the major industries in Puerto Rico, slaves worked mostly in coffee plantations and sugar cane fields. By Royal proclamation slavery was abolished on 22 March 1873.

In 1874, a group of citizens built a small park in Ponce in memory of the historic event. In 1880 Olimpio Otero, Juan Mayoral Barnés, and Román Baldorioty de Castro were instrumental in creating the concept for a park dedicated to the commemorating the abolition of slavery, the only such memorial in the Caribbean. Juan Mayoral Barnés brought the idea for the creation of the park to the Ponce Municipal Assembly on 14 March 1880. It was unanimously approved by the Assembly, ratified by the Central Government, and confirmed by Royal Decree on 1 March 1881.

In 1956, under the administration of Ponce mayor Andrés Grillasca Salas, the park was renovated and enlarged to include an obelisk and the statue.

== Description ==
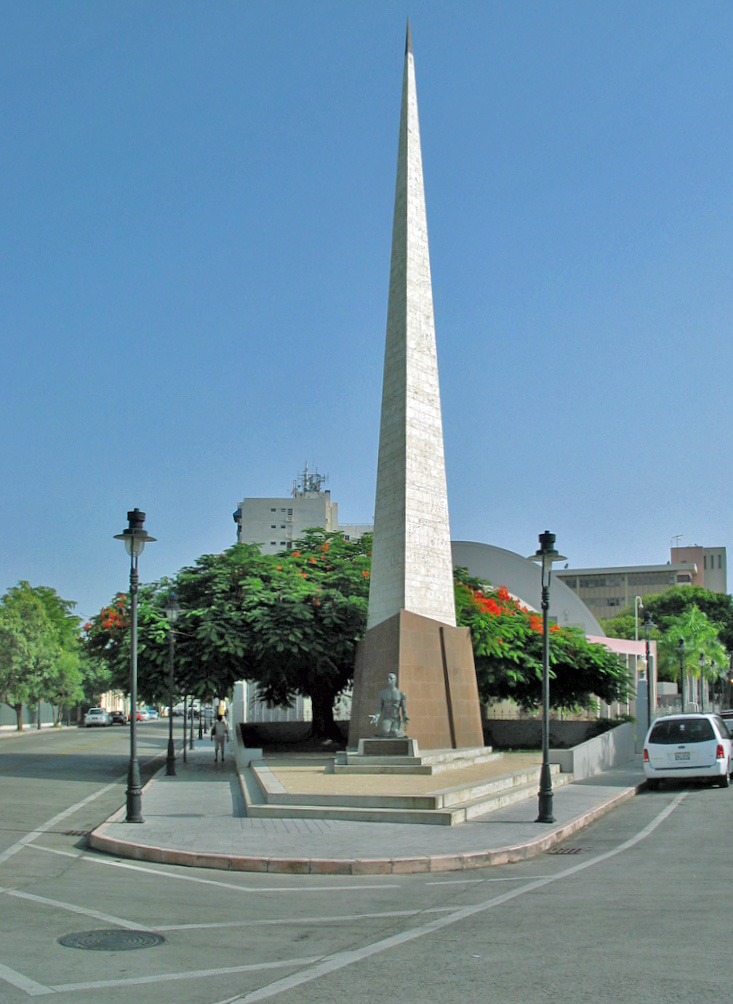
Obelisco a la libertad (Obelisk to freedom).

Built in 1956 to be part of the renovation and enlargement of the park that had stood there since the 1890s, El Hombre Redimido was designed by Victor M. Cott (b. 1898, Collores, Juana Díaz, Puerto Rico) and is forged in bronze. Victor Cott himself modeled for the statue on its knees and the bronze statue was subsequently forged in the United States. It is approximately four feet high. It was restored in 2006.

== See also ==
- Afro-Puerto Ricans
- List of modern obelisks
