= Olimpio Otero Vergés =

Puerto Rican politician and businessman

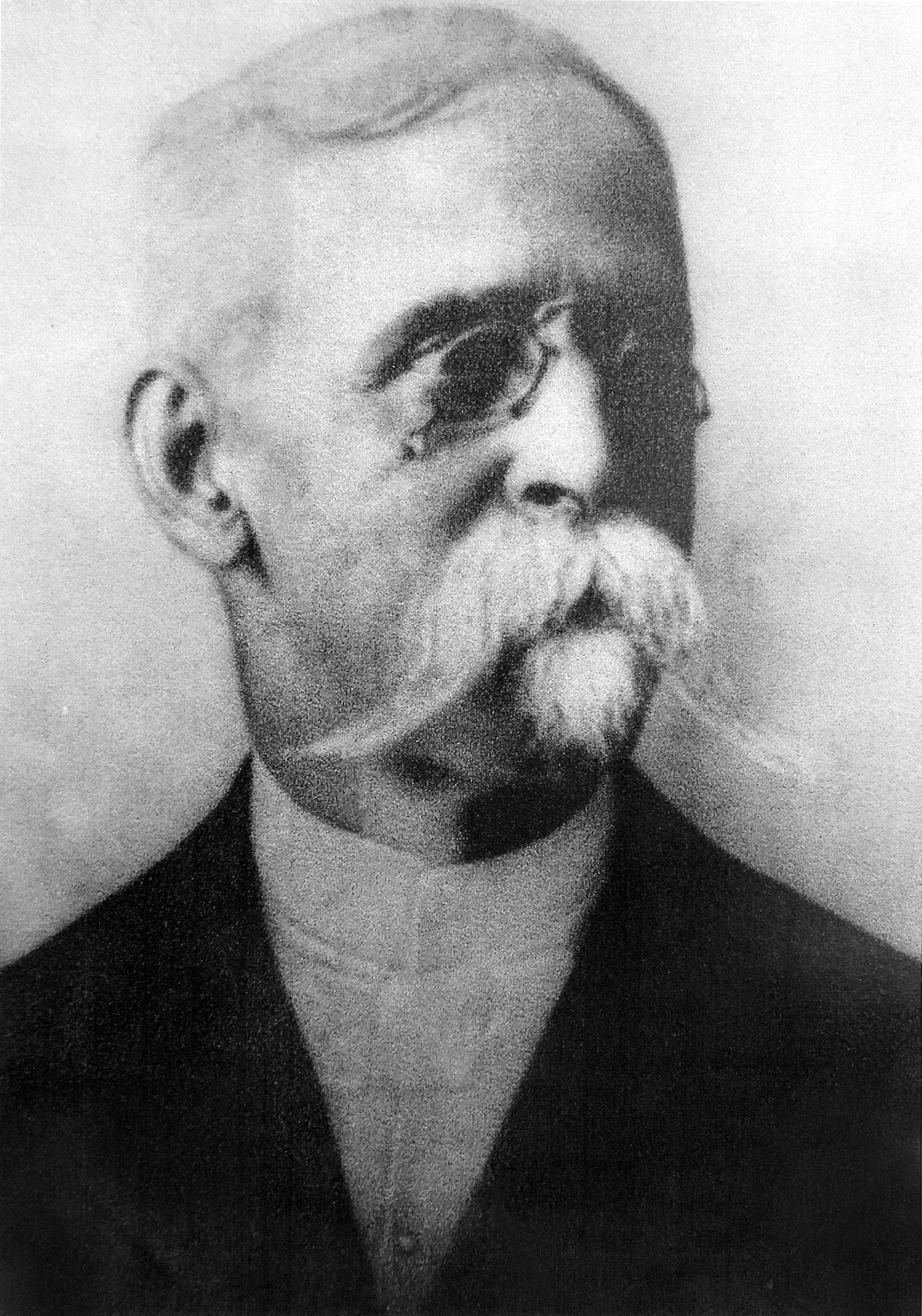
- Olimpio Otero Vergés, ca. 1905
- Born: 1845; Ponce, Puerto Rico
- Died: 7 September 1911; Ponce, Puerto Rico
- Occupations: Merchant, Attorney, Composer, Musical editor, and Civic leader

Olimpio Otero Vergés (Note: Most authorities use the name "Olimpio Otero Vergés". However, social scientist and historian Socorro Girón appears to name him "Olimpio Otero Aquilina" (Ponce, el teatro La Perla y La Campana de la Almudaina. 1992. Page 182.)) (1845 – 7 September 1911) was a merchant, attorney, composer, musical editor, and a civic leader in Ponce, Puerto Rico.

== Early years ==
Otero Vergés was born in Ponce, Puerto Rico, in 1845. His parents were Antonio Otero Aquilina y Josefa Verges de Perea. He was one of three children in the family. His siblings were Adquilina and Josefa Verges de Clodomiro.

== Merchant, composer, and musical editor ==
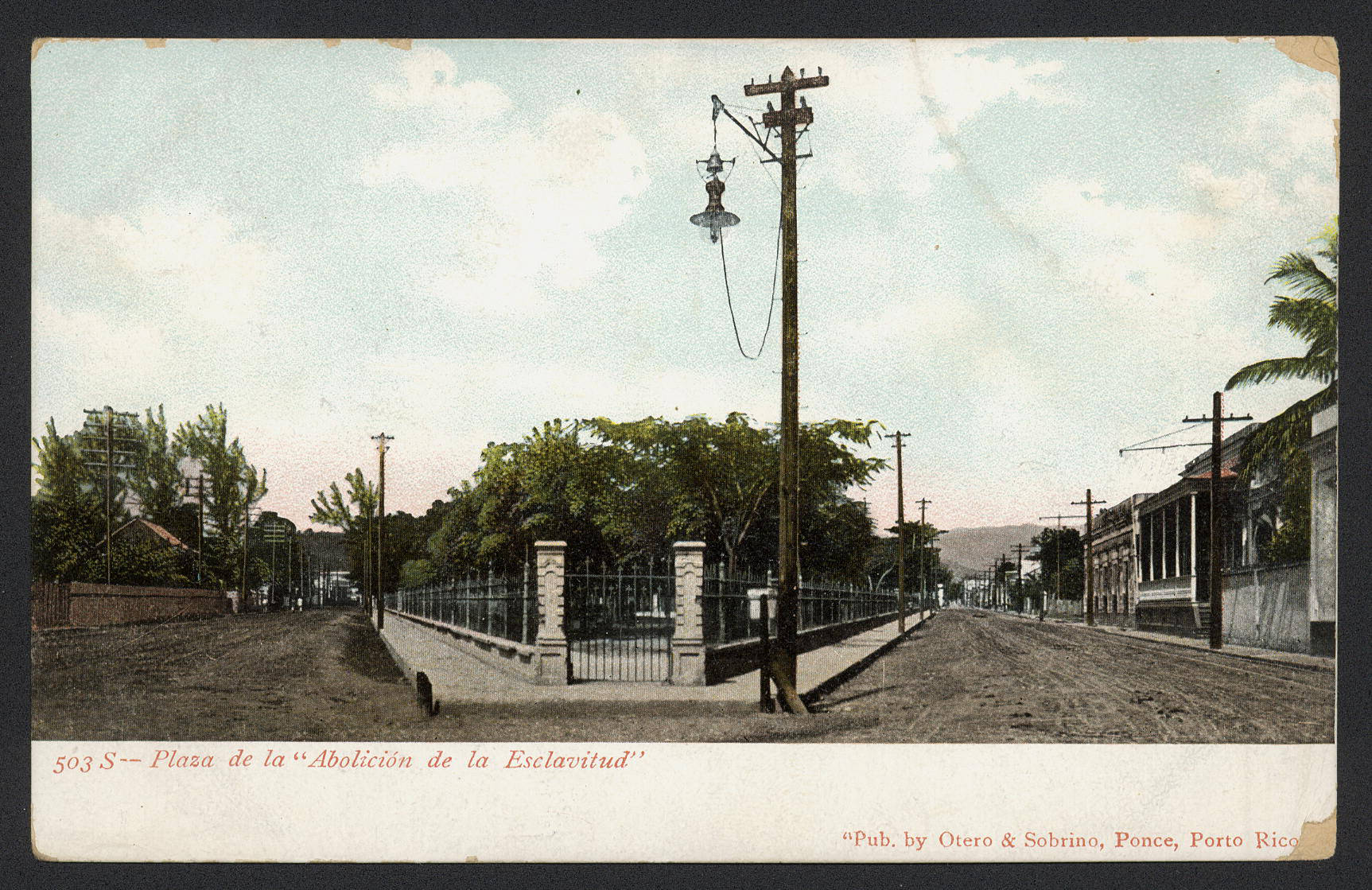
The postcard above was one of the items made and sold at Otero's Bazar Otero in 1908

Otero founded the first publishing house to publish and distribute Puerto Rican music, called Bazar Otero, on Calle Atocha. His efforts made possible the circulation and distribution of music from the most important composers of his time, such as Manuel Gregorio Tavarez and Juan Morel Campos. The Bazar was also a gathering point for musicians of the area. One of Otero's better known musical compositions is "La Cuñadita".

== Civic leader and political activist ==
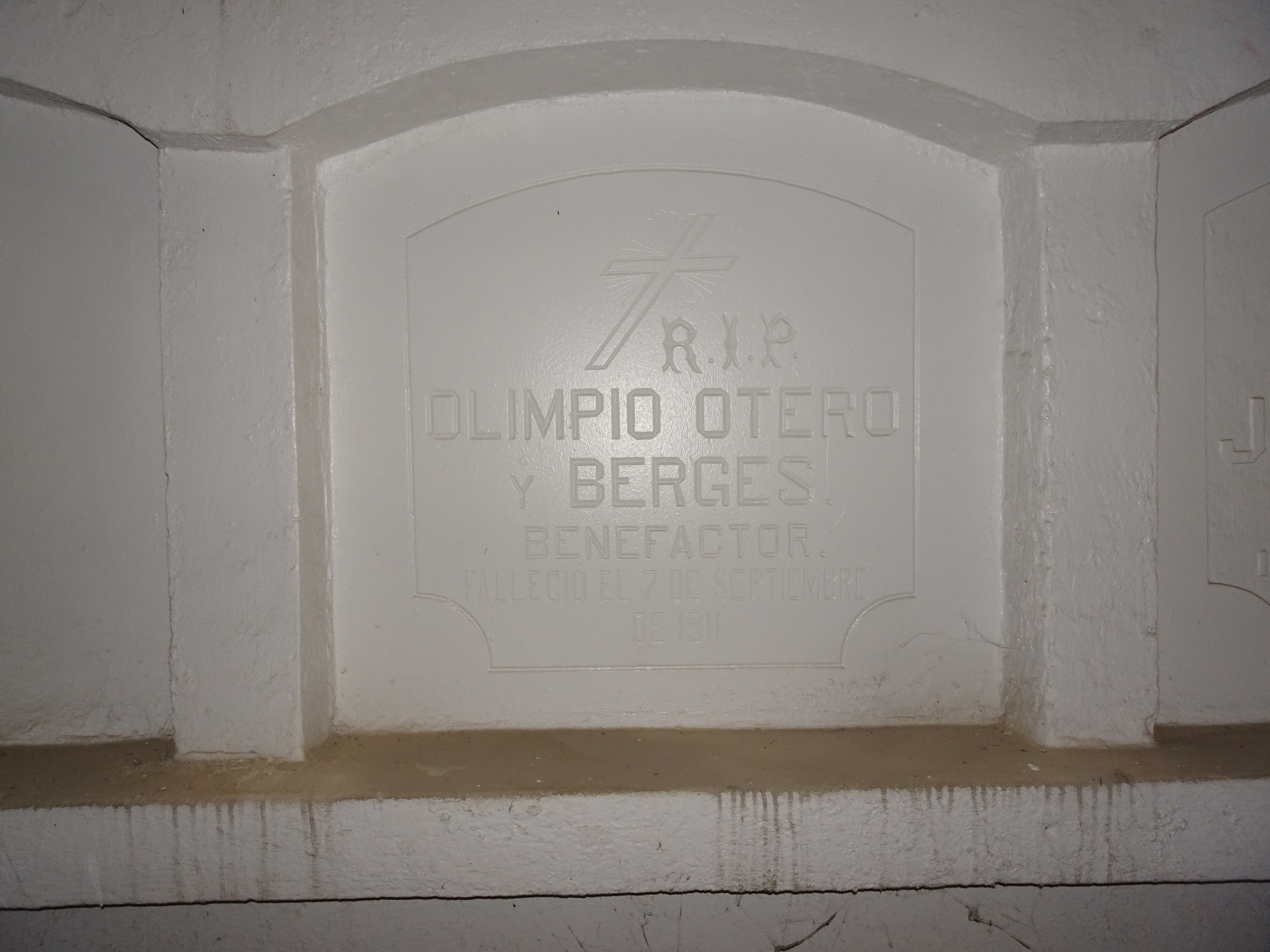
Otero Verges's niche at Cementerio Civil de Ponce

As a civic leader, Otero Verges led the Agricultural and Industrial Tobacco Exposition held in Ponce in 1883, just a year after the successful 1882 Exposition Fair that was held in the same city at Plaza Las Delicias in the building now called Parque de Bombas.

In October, 1887, Otero led a three-member commission that organized an expedition to Madrid, Spain, for Julio Vizcarrondo and Juan Bautista Arrillaga Roque to denounce the injustices perpetrated by Spanish governor General Romualdo Palacio González. It resulted in the removal of General Palacio from office. He was a representative (Diputado) to the Spanish Courts.

Otero is also known for his activism for the creation of a road, now PR-123, to link Ponce and Arecibo in the late nineteenth century. In 1903, the Puerto Rico Legislature named a bridge on the Ponce to Adjuntas section of the road in his memory. The bridge is located in Barrio Magueyes of the municipality of Ponce. A prominent local civic and community leader, Otero was also a member of the organizing board that made possible the 1883 Ponce Fair.

== Parque de la Abolicion ==
In 1880 Otero, together with Juan Mayoral Barnés and Román Baldorioty de Castro, was instrumental in creating the concept for a park in Ponce — known as Parque de la Abolicion — dedicated to the abolition of slavery, at the time the only such memorial in the Caribbean.

== Legacy ==
- In Ponce, there is a school named after him on Calle Villa (Final).
- A bridge between Ponce and Adjuntas is called the Otero Viaduct, in his memory.
- A plaque recognizes him at Ponce's Park of Illustrious Ponce Citizens.

== See also ==
- List of Puerto Ricans
