= Andrés Grillasca Salas =

Puerto Rican politician

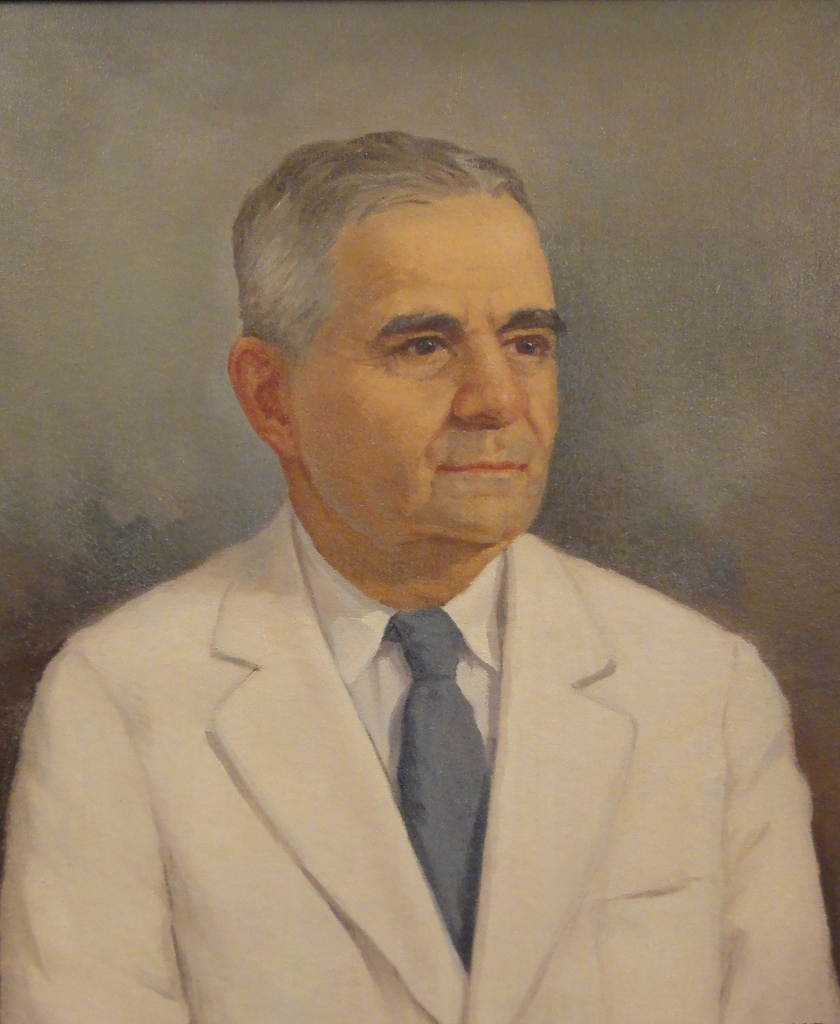
- Mayor Andrés Grillasca Salas

122nd Mayor of Ponce, Puerto Rico
- In office 2 January 1941 – 9 May 1956
- Preceded by: José Tormos Diego
- Succeeded by: José Dapena Laguna

Personal details
- Born: 6 January 1888 Adjuntas, Puerto Rico
- Died: 19 December 1973 (aged 85) Ponce, Puerto Rico
- Party: Partido Popular Democrático
- Spouse: Angela Trani
- Occupation: Farmer

Andrés Grillasca Salas (6 January 1888 – 19 December 1973) was a Puerto Rican farmer from Adjuntas, Puerto Rico, and Mayor of Ponce, Puerto Rico, from 2 January 1941 to 9 May 1956. Until the 1990s administration of Rafael Cordero Santiago, Grillasca Salas had the distinction of being the longest-serving mayor of the city (16 years). He was known to always dress in white clothes.

== Early years ==
Grillasca Salas was born in the neighboring town of Adjuntas in 1888. He was the son of Francisco Grillasca and Jesusa Salas. He married Angela Trani.

== Political life ==
Grillasca Salas defeated future governor of Puerto Rico Luis A. Ferre in the bid for mayor of Ponce in 1940.

=== Juan Morel Campos Music Institute ===
In 1947 Grillasca established the Escuela Libre de Música de Ponce. The school is now known as the Juan Morel Campos Music Institute.

=== Sports and recreational facilities ===
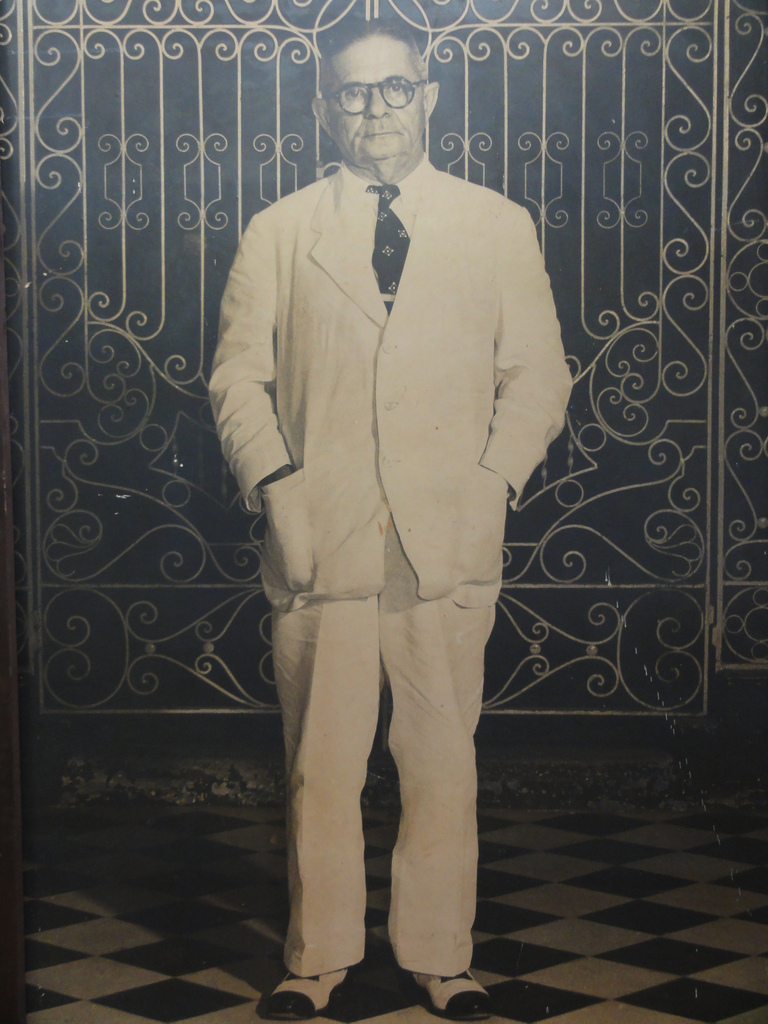
Grillasca during his mayoral term

Grillasca Salas also had an interest in sports, and in 1949 he inaugurated the Francisco Montaner Stadium in Ponce. He also established a fund for the creation of a second new sports venue in Ponce. To accomplish it, he established a special contribution for every sports activity held in the city. Still short of funds, the project was not developed for many years. However, during the administration of mayor Eduardo Ruberté Bisó (1964–1968), new interest in the project developed and construction started on what was then called the Ponce Coliseum. It was later renamed the Juan "Pachín" Vicens Auditorium, in honor of the greatest figure in Ponce basketball.

=== Abolition Park ===
Grillasca Salas is also remembered for building, in 1956, what is to this day the only monument in the Antilles dedicated to the abolition of slavery. The monument is now surrounded by a park with graceful gardens and is located next to an outdoors acoustic amphitheater, and is called Abolition Park.

== Death, honors, and legacy ==
Grillasca Salas died in Ponce on 19 December 1973. He was 85 years old. The cause of his death was "cerebral arteriosclerosis with terminal pneumonia." He was buried at Cementerio Civil de Ponce.

Grillasca Salas is honored at Ponce's Park of Illustrious Ponce Citizens. Only six, of over 100 Ponce mayors, are honored there. He is remembered as a mayor who fought for the autonomy of the municipality of Ponce from the centralization forces at the Central Government in San Juan. In Ponce, there is a private housing development named after him ("Villa Grillasca"), as well as a hospital, Hospital Oncologico Andres Grillasca, named in his honor.

== See also ==
- Ponce, Puerto Rico
- List of Puerto Ricans
- List of mayors of Ponce, Puerto Rico

Political offices
Preceded by José Tormos Diego	Mayor of Ponce, Puerto Rico; 1941– 9 May 1956	Succeeded by José Dapena Laguna
