= Cires (disambiguation) =

Cires may refer to:

- Cirès, a commune in the Haute-Garonne department in France
- CIRES, the Cooperative Institute for Research in Environmental Sciences
- CIRES (Taiwan), the enter for Interdisciplinary Research on Ecology and Sustainability
- CIRES (Mexico), the association that administers the Mexican Seismic Alert System
- CIRES (plant), the EPPO code of Cirsium erisithales
- Cires-lès-Mello station, a railway station in the Oise department, France
- Point Cires, a promontory and two islands off the northern coast of Morocco

== See also ==
- Cireș (disambiguation)
- Cire (disambiguation)
