= List of shipwrecks in 1927 =

The list of shipwrecks in 1927 includes all ships sunk, foundered, grounded, or otherwise lost during 1927.

table of contents
1927
Jan	Feb	Mar	Apr
May	Jun	Jul	Aug
Sep	Oct	Nov	Dec
Unknown date

== January ==
=== 1 January ===
List of shipwrecks: 1 January 1927
Ship	State	Description
Ida A. Corkum	United States	The schooner was wrecked near Sable Island, Nova Scotia, Canada.
Mentor	Greece	The cargo ship ran aground at Horli, Soviet Union. She was refloated on 6 January.
Tzar Ferdinand	Bulgaria	The cargo ship came ashore on Kos, Greece. She was refloated on 6 January.

=== 2 January ===
List of shipwrecks: 2 January 1927
Ship	State	Description
Sheila	United Kingdom	The cargo ship ran aground at Fern na More Point, Ross and Cromarty (57°34′N 5°51′W). She was abandoned on 4 January.

=== 5 January ===
List of shipwrecks: 5 January 1927
Ship	State	Description
Three Twins	United States	The 10-gross register ton, 33.8-foot (10.3 m) motor vessel sank off Prince of Wales Island in the Alexander Archipelago opposite Ketchikan, Territory of Alaska. Only one of the three people aboard survived.

=== 6 January ===
List of shipwrecks: 6 January 1927
Ship	State	Description
Charles G. Black	United States	The cargo ship ran aground off South Pass. She was refloated on 11 January.
Yawata Maru No.2	Japan	The cargo ship collided with Harada Maru No.7 (Japan) in the Shimonoseki Strait and sank with some loss of life.

=== 7 January ===
List of shipwrecks: 7 January 1927
Ship	State	Description
Baralt	Netherlands	The cargo ship struck a sunken wreck at Maracaibo, Venezuela and was beached on Zapara Island.

=== 9 January ===
List of shipwrecks: 9 January 1927
Ship	State	Description
Clan Maqcuarrie	United Kingdom	The cargo ship ran aground in the Paraná River, Argentina. She was refloated on 21 January.

=== 11 January ===
List of shipwrecks: 11 January 1927
Ship	State	Description
Louise Greer	United States	The tug collided with Howard (United States) at Norfolk, Virginia and sank.

=== 12 January ===
List of shipwrecks: 12 January 1927
Ship	State	Description
Burpee L. Tucker	Canada	The schooner was driven ashore on Seal Island, Nova Scotia, Canada and was a total loss.

=== 13 January ===
List of shipwrecks: 13 January 1927
Ship	State	Description
Charles Whittemore	United States	The four-masted schooner caught fire and was then dismasted in a gale in the Atlantic Ocean off Cape Cod, Massachusetts. She was abandoned by her crew. A United States government ship towed her into Provincetown.
Essex Isles	United Kingdom	The tanker caught fire and sank at Tampico, Tamaulipas, Mexico and was beached.

=== 14 January ===
List of shipwrecks: 14 January 1927
Ship	State	Description
Swiftsure	United Kingdom	The cargo ship collided with another vessel in the Bristol Channel. She was beached at Cardiff, Glamorgan.

=== 15 January ===
List of shipwrecks: 15 January 1927
Ship	State	Description
Arita Maru No.2	Japan	The cargo ship sank in the Sea of Japan off the east coast of Korea.
Oscar Dickson	Sweden	The cargo ship collided with Alpha (Norway) off Oscarsborg Fortress in the Oslofjord, Norway and sank. Her crew were rescued.

=== 16 January ===
List of shipwrecks: 16 January 1927
Ship	State	Description
Odysseus	Greece	The cargo ship departed Malta for Antwerp, Belgium on 16 January. A lifeboat and the body of a crew member washed up at Philippeville, Algeria on or around 8 February. Presumed foundered in the Mediterranean Sea with the loss of all hands.
Shinten Maru	Japan	The cargo ship ran aground off the Shiriyazaki Lighthouse, Honshu. She was refloated on 7 February.

=== 17 January ===
List of shipwrecks: 17 January 1927
Ship	State	Description
Vidzeme	Latvia	The cargo ship ran aground at Sõrve. She was refloated on 20 January.

=== 18 January ===
List of shipwrecks: 18 January 1927
Ship	State	Description
Amelia and Jane	United Kingdom	The auxiliary schooner caught fire in the Irish Sea 8 nautical miles (15 km) off Drummore, Wigtownshire and sank. Her crew survived.
Emilie Dunford	United Kingdom	The cargo ship collided with Sheaf Arrow (United Kingdom) in the Seine at Quillebeuf-sur-Seine, Eure, France and sank with the loss of two crew. Survivors were rescued by Sheaf Arrow. She was refloated on 25 March.

=== 19 January ===
List of shipwrecks: 19 January 1927
Ship	State	Description
Mildred	Canada	The tug struck a submerged object, or was rammed, in Minas Channel between Spencer Island, and Cape Split, Nova Scotia, Canada and sank. Her crew were rescued.
Sava	Yugoslavia	The cargo ship ran aground at Kustendje, Bulgaria. She was refloated on 13 March.

=== 20 January ===
List of shipwrecks: 20 January 1927
Ship	State	Description
Bilko	United States	The cargo ship collided with Creole (United States) in the Mississippi River 75 nautical miles (139 km) downstream of New Orleans, Louisiana and was beached.
Enniskillen	United Kingdom	The coaster departed Blyth, Northumberland for Dundalk, County Louth, Ireland. No further trace, presumed foundered with the loss of all hands.

=== 21 January ===
List of shipwrecks: 21 January 1927
Ship	State	Description
Karroo	United Kingdom	The cargo ship caught fire at Staten Island, New York, United States. and settled. She was refloated the next day.

=== 23 January ===
List of shipwrecks: 23 January 1927
Ship	State	Description
Terje	Norway	The cargo ship collided with Nassau (United States) in the East River at Astoria, New York and was beached. She was refloated on 24 January.

=== 24 January ===
List of shipwrecks: 24 January 1927
Ship	State	Description
Fukuoka Maru	Japan	The cargo ship was driven ashore and sank near Manao.

=== 25 January ===
List of shipwrecks: 25 January 1927
Ship	State	Description
Antigoon	Belgium	The cargo ship collided with Elisabeth van België (Belgium) in the Scheldt at Boomke and was beached.
USCGC Lincoln	United States Coast Guard	The cutter caught fire in the Atlantic Ocean and sank with the loss of six of her eight crew. Survivors were rescued by Defender (United Kingdom).

=== 26 January ===
List of shipwrecks: 26 January 1927
Ship	State	Description
Lonsdale	United Kingdom	The cargo ship ran aground at Portrush, County Antrim and was abandoned by her crew.

=== 27 January ===
List of shipwrecks: 27 January 1927
Ship	State	Description
Mary	Latvia	The cargo ship collided with Hero (United Kingdom) in the Weser at Höherweg and was beached. She was refloated on 31 January.
Retuerto	Spain	The cargo ship was wrecked at Pravia, Asturias with the loss of seventeen crew.
Rodonto	United Kingdom	The cargo ship ran aground at Molara Island, Sardinia, Italy, and was wrecked. Her crew were rescued.

=== 28 January ===
List of shipwrecks: 28 January 1927
Ship	State	Description
Antinoë	United Kingdom	The cargo ship foundered in the Atlantic Ocean. Her crew were rescued by President Roosevelt (United States).

=== 29 January ===
List of shipwrecks: 29 January 1927
Ship	State	Description
Celtic	United Kingdom	The ocean liner was rammed by Anaconda (United States) in the Atlantic Ocean off Fire Island, New York. Both ships were repaired and returned to service.
Hokoku Maru	Japan	The cargo ship ran aground in the Tsugaru Straits. She was refloated on 19 February and sailed to Hakodate, where she was declared a constructive total loss.

=== 30 January ===
List of shipwrecks: 30 January 1927
Ship	State	Description
Dundrennan	United Kingdom	The cargo ship collided with Tasso (Italy) in the Scheldt and was beached. She was refloated on 2 February.
Oberschlesien	Germany	The tanker collided with City of Salisbury (United Kingdom) off Brunsbüttelkoog, Schleswig-Holstein and was beached.

=== 31 January ===
List of shipwrecks: 31 January 1927
Ship	State	Description
Izabran	Yugoslavia	The cargo ship ran aground at Cape Hatteras, North Carolina, United States. She was refloated on 3 February.
Juvigny	United States	The cargo ship collided with Valemore (United Kingdom) in Delaware Bay and sank. Her crew were rescued by Valemore.

== February ==
=== 1 February ===
List of shipwrecks: 1 February 1927
Ship	State	Description
Helene	Germany	The schooner collided with Scotscraig (United Kingdom) at Kiel, Schleswig-Holstein and sank with the loss of her captain. Survivors were rescued by Scotscraig.

=== 2 February ===
List of shipwrecks: 2 February 1927
Ship	State	Description
Lodovica	Italy	The cargo ship ran aground 10 nautical miles (19 km) east of Maldonado, Uruguay and was abandoned by her crew. She was refloated on 17 March.
Oberon	United Kingdom	The cargo ship ran aground at Oban, Argyllshire. She was refloated on 18 March.
Tottenham	United Kingdom	The cargo ship ran aground at Novorossiysk, Soviet Union. She was refloated on 6 February.

=== 3 February ===
List of shipwrecks: 3 February 1927
Ship	State	Description
Maashaven	Netherlands	The cargo ship ran aground at Ventspils, Latvia. Salvage efforts were suspended on 4 February. She was refloated on 14 February.
Merannio	United Kingdom	The cargo ship collided with a Port of London Authority hopper barge in the River Thames at Purfleet, Essex and sank.
Sheerness	United Kingdom	The cargo ship ran aground on the Tuskar Rock and was wrecked with the loss of seventeen of her 31 crew. Survivors were rescued by Kingstown (United Kingdom).

=== 4 February ===
List of shipwrecks: 4 February 1927
Ship	State	Description
Huallaga	Peru	The cargo ship ran aground at Ilo. She was abandoned as a total loss on 10 February.
Memfi	Italy	The cargo ship ran aground on the Berli Shoals. She was declared a total loss.
Muskogee	United States	The cargo ship ran aground in the South Pass. She was refloated on 7 February.
Phyllis Hudson	United Kingdom	The cargo ship collided with Java (Netherlands) off Walsoorden, Netherlands and sank. Her crew were rescued.
San Martino	Italy	The cargo ship collided with Dubravka (Yugoslavia) in the Mediterranean Sea 4 nautical miles (7.4 km) north of Messina, Sicily and sank. Her crew were rescued.
Selwyn Eddy	United States	The cargo ship came ashore in Vineyard Sound and was wrecked.
Ulsnes	Norway	The cargo ship ran aground on the west coast of Skagen, Denmark. Her crew were rescued. She was refloated on 9 February.

=== 5 February ===
List of shipwrecks: 5 February 1927
Ship	State	Description
Fox	United Kingdom	The cargo ship sprang a leak and sank in the English Channel off Le Havre, Seine-Inférieure, France. Her crew were rescued.
King Robert	United Kingdom	The cargo ship ran aground in the Indio Channel. She was refloated on 13 February.

=== 6 February ===
List of shipwrecks: 6 February 1927
Ship	State	Description
Cape Cod	United States	The coaster collided with Michael Tracey (United States) in Hell Gate, New York and sank. Her crew were rescued.
La Tourmente	France	The schooner sprang a leak and foundered off Sark, Channel Islands. Her crew were rescued.

=== 7 February ===
List of shipwrecks: 7 February 1927
Ship	State	Description
Caraibe	France	The cargo ship ran aground at Antilla, Cuba. She was later refloated, arriving at Santiago de Cuba on 15 February.
Durostor	Romania	The cargo ship ran aground at Constanţa whilst going to the assistance of Imperatul Taian (Romania). She was refloated on 22 February.
Imperatul Traian	Romania	The cargo ship ran aground at Cape Tuzla, Soviet Union. She was refloated on 2 September, but was driven ashore again on 3 September.
John Francis Stuard	United States	The four-masted schooner ran aground on a reef off Port-a-Piment, Haiti. She was a total loss.
Magrace	United Kingdom	The cargo ship was destroyed by fire at Slidell, Louisiana.
M. T. Cicerone	Italy	The cargo ship ran aground at Ponta Delgada, Azores, Portugal. She was declared a total loss on 10 February.

=== 8 February ===
List of shipwrecks: 8 February 1927
Ship	State	Description
Shinchiku Maru	Japan	The cargo ship ran aground at Misaki, Aomori. She was declared a total loss on 1 March.

=== 9 February ===
List of shipwrecks: 9 February 1927
Ship	State	Description
Galava	United Kingdom	The coaster foundered off Newcastle, New South Wales, Australia with some loss of life.
Lord Byron	United Kingdom	The cargo ship ran aground at Jaffa, Palestine. Seven of her 28 crew were landed on 11 February. She was refloated on 28 March.
Marie Beasley	United States	The barge caught fire, burned, and sank near Indian River, Delaware, or sunk in a collision (38°33′N 74°42′W). The wreck was blown up as a hazard to navigation.

=== 11 February ===
List of shipwrecks: 11 February 1927
Ship	State	Description
Akti	Greece	The cargo ship struck rocks at Alexandria, Egypt and ran aground. She was refloated on 3 March.
Francesco Ciampini	Italy	The cargo ship collided with Signe (Denmark) in the English Channel off the South Goodwin Lightship (United Kingdom) and sank. All 30 crew were rescued by Signe.
Plodder	United Kingdom	The coaster collided with Endymion (United Kingdom) in the English Channel 20 nautical miles (37 km) south east of Shoreham-by-Sea, Sussex and sank. All eleven crew were rescued by Harley and the fishing smack Bonny Lena (both United Kingdom).

=== 12 February ===
List of shipwrecks: 12 February 1927
Ship	State	Description
Cape Clear	United States	The 17-gross register ton fishing vessel was wrecked in heavy fog and darkness on the northeast coast of Langara Island in the Queen Charlotte Islands in British Columbia, Canada. Her crew of five survived, but she became a total loss.
Emma	United Kingdom	The Thames barge was struck by London Shipper (United Kingdom) in the River Thames at Greenwich, London and was beached.
Rhenania	Germany	The cargo ship ran aground at Simrishamn, Sweden. She was refloated on 16 February.

=== 13 February ===
List of shipwrecks: 13 February 1927
Ship	State	Description
Raa	Norway	The coaster was rammed and sunk by Gordejuela (Spain) in the English Channel 4 nautical miles (7.4 km) off Folkestone, Kent and sank. All seventeen crew were rescued by Gordejuela.

=== 14 February ===
List of shipwrecks: 14 February 1927
Ship	State	Description
Hibernia	United Kingdom	The auxiliary schooner collided with City of Birmingham (United Kingdom) in the Thames Estuary and sank. Her crew were rescued by City of Birmingham.
Northern #35	United States	The schooner barge sank near Five Fathoms Bank Lightship, New Jersey. On 17 February her deckhouse and other debris were located at (38°37′N 74°42′W), wreckage towed to the Lewes, Delaware breakwater and beached.
Plawsworth	United Kingdom	The cargo ship collided with Goulandris (Greece) in the North Sea and was beached at Minsenersand, Germany.

=== 17 February ===
List of shipwrecks: 17 February 1927
Ship	State	Description
Cecil P. Stewart	United States	The schooner, or barkentine, was driven ashore at Harvey Cedars, New Jersey and was a total loss. Her crew were rescued.

=== 19 February ===
List of shipwrecks: 19 February 1927
Ship	State	Description
James Howard	United States	The barge grounded in a storm near Beach Haven, New Jersey.
West Point	United Kingdom	The schooner barge stranded near Tuckers Beach, New Jersey.
W. T. Bell	United States	The 119-foot (36 m), 180-ton schooner stranded in a 70 mph (110 km/h) nor'easter near Oak Neck, Bayville, New York on Long Island. To prevent the rum runner from being salvaged, she was damaged beyond repair with dynamite by the United States Coast Guard in March 1927.

=== 20 February ===
List of shipwrecks: 20 February 1927
Ship	State	Description
Ak Deniz	Turkey	The mail ship ran aground at Istanbul. She was refloated on 22 March.
USCGC CG-238	United States Coast Guard	The cutter capsized in a storm.
Nancy	United States	The 259-foot (79 m), 2,117-gross register ton five-masted schooner dragged her anchor during a storm and was wrecked without loss of life on Nantasket Beach at Hull, Massachusetts. Her wreck subsequently was a tourist attraction for many years until it ultimately was burned and her keel became buried in sand.

=== 22 February ===
List of shipwrecks: 22 February 1927
Ship	State	Description
Evelyn V. Miller	United Kingdom	The schooner was driven ashore at Long Point, Ontario, Canada and was a total loss. Her crew were rescued.
Vendlus	Estonia	The cargo ship ran aground and sank at Hermano, Sweden. Her crew were rescued.

=== 23 February ===
List of shipwrecks: 23 February 1927
Ship	State	Description
Black Sea	United Kingdom	The tanker exploded, burnt and sank in New York Bay. Her crew survived. She was later raised, repairs and returned to service.
Mary E. Moore	United States	The cargo ship lost her propeller and tailshaft, filled and sank off the Coquille River near Bandon, Oregon.
Scandia	United States	The 116-gross register ton, 90.8-foot (27.7 m) fishing vessel was wrecked on rocks at the entrance to the harbor at Kodiak, Territory of Alaska. Her entire crew of 15 survived and were rescued by the vessel Duncan 1 (United States).

=== 24 February ===
List of shipwrecks: 24 February 1927
Ship	State	Description
Stenies	Greece	The cargo ship collided with another vessel in the Atlantic Ocean 5 nautical miles (9.3 km) off Land's End, Cornwall, United Kingdom and sank with the loss off twenty of her 21 crew. The survivor was rescued by the fishing vessel Fox Trott (France).

=== 25 February ===
List of shipwrecks: 25 February 1927
Ship	State	Description
Artemis	Honduras	The steam yacht was destroyed by fire in the Atlantic Ocean off Key West, Florida.
City of Annapolis	United States	The cargo ship collided with City of Richmond (United States) 2 N.M South of Smith's Point, in Chesapeake Bay and sank. USCGC Carrabasset discovered her deck house, pilot house and other debris on 27 February and sank the debris by ramming at (37°40′N 76°06′W).
Grodno	United Kingdom	The cargo ship ran aground at Corfu, Greece. She was refloated on 28 February and found to be extensively damaged.
Industry	United Kingdom	The Thames barge collided with Marsden (United Kingdom) in the Thames Estuary and sank. Her crew were rescued.
Kathleen Conrad	United Kingdom	The auxiliary sailing ship came ashore at Halifax, Nova Scotia, Canada and was a total loss.
Mary E. Moore	United States	The cargo ship sank in the Pacific Ocean off the mouth of the Coquille River. Her crew were rescued.
Sarrebourg	France	The cargo ship ran aground on the Portsal Rocks, Brest, Finistère and was wrecked.

=== 26 February ===
List of shipwrecks: 26 February 1927
Ship	State	Description
Gardenia	Italy	The cargo ship struck floating wreckage in the Great Belt and developed a leak. She was beached at Bandholm, Sweden.
Wampus Cat	United States	The lugger sank in a gale off Chico Point. Raised a few days later and taken to Biloxi, Mississippi.

=== 28 February ===
List of shipwrecks: 28 February 1927
Ship	State	Description
Hilton	United States	The cargo ship struck a submerged object in the Kill Van Kull and was beached. She was refloated on 31 March.
Hoffnung	Germany	The auxiliary sailing ship sprang a leak and was beached at Hamburg.

=== Unknown date ===
List of shipwrecks: Unknown date 1927
Ship	State	Description
City of Waterford	United Kingdom	The cargo ship came ashore in the Outer Hebrides. She was declared a total loss on 15 February.
Richard T. Greene	United States	The schooner burned and sank at Keyport, New Jersey or Morgan, New Jersey sometime in February.
Venus	United States	The vessel was severely damaged during a storm in the Gulf of Alaska off Kodiak, Territory of Alaska, losing her wheelhouse, deck gear, and dories. She arrived at Kodiak in a wrecked condition, with little left of her other than her hull and Bollinger engine.

== March ==
=== 1 March ===
List of shipwrecks: 1 March 1927
Ship	State	Description
Millocrat	United Kingdom	The cargo ship ran aground at Greenisland, County Antrim. She was refloated on 4 March.

=== 2 March ===
List of shipwrecks: 2 March 1927
Ship	State	Description
G. J. Cherry	United States	The 150-foot (46 m), 533-ton schooner was waterlogged in a storm 200 miles (320 km) off Cape Hatteras in the Atlantic Ocean (34°02′N 72°05′W). Her crew were taken off 13 days later by the tanker Gulf Point (United States). She was later taken in tow by USCGC Carrabasset (United States Coast Guard) at 33°40′N 72°36′W and towed to Hampton Roads.
Jessie G. Noyes	United States	The schooner broke up in a hurricane in the Atlantic Ocean. Three crewmen were washed overboard and drowned. Eight survivors drifted on a part of the quarterdeck until rescued by the steamer Topeka (Norway) on 7 March.

=== 3 March ===
List of shipwrecks: 3 March 1927
Ship	State	Description
Amanda	Norway	The cargo ship was wrecked at Tamatave, Madagascar in a cyclone.
Beechtree	United Kingdom	The cargo ship ran aground on Peel Rock, off the coast of Cornwall and was wrecked. Her crew were rescued.
Catinat	France	The cargo ship was driven ashore at Tamitave in a cyclone. She was declared a total loss on 23 March.
De Riziny	France	The sailing ship was wrecked at Tamitave in a cyclone.
Elizabeth	United Kingdom	The barque was driven ashore at Tamitave in a cyclone.
Sainte-Anne	France	The cargo ship was driven ashore at Tamitave in a cyclone with the loss of seven crew.
Ville de Marseille	France	The cargo ship was driven ashore at Tamitave in a cyclone. She was refloated on 21 March.

=== 4 March ===
List of shipwrecks: 4 March 1927
Ship	State	Description
Montclair	Canada	During a voyage from Halifax, Nova Scotia, Canada, to New York City with a cargo of wood lath, the 142-foot (43 m), 371-gross register ton three-masted schooner ran aground on Orleans Bar off Nauset Beach on Cape Cod, Massachusetts, and broke up. Her wreck then washed ashore on the beach. Five members of her crew perished; two survived.

=== 5 March ===
List of shipwrecks: 5 March 1927
Ship	State	Description
Cabo Hatteras	Spain	The cargo ship caught fire in the Atlantic Ocean 140 nautical miles (260 km) east south east of Sandy Hook, New Jersey and was abandoned by her crew. They were rescued by Cabo Torres (Spain). Cabo Hatteras was shelled and sunk on 6 March by USCGC Seminole ( United States Coast Guard).
WTB Co. No. 33	United States	While moored in a cove near Ward Cove in Southeast Alaska for the winter to four dolphins that had been weakened by teredos, the 733-ton, 160-foot (48.8 m) scow was blown ashore and wrecked when the dolphins gave way in high winds. No one was aboard the scow at the time.

=== 7 March ===
List of shipwrecks: 7 March 1927
Ship	State	Description
Carna	Netherlands	The cargo ship ran aground in the Dominican Republic and was wrecked.
Chaudiere	United Kingdom	The cargo ship ran aground at Ardrossan, Ayrshire whilst awaiting scrapping, which commenced on 14 February 1928.
Guy Thorne	United Kingdom	The 137.4-foot (41.9 m), 331-ton steam trawler went ashore at Mefjordboen, Vestfjorder, Norway. She was salvaged, repaired and returned to service in 1928.

=== 8 March ===
List of shipwrecks: 8 March 1927
Ship	State	Description
Akashi Maru		The cargo ship was driven ashore at Dairen, China in a cyclone and wrecked.
Paul Lecat	France	The ocean liner ran aground in the Yangtze 20 nautical miles (37 km) from Woosung, China. She was refloated on 20 March.

=== 9 March ===
List of shipwrecks: 9 March 1927
Ship	State	Description
Kinonne Maru	Japan	The cargo ship was wrecked at Mokpo, Korea.

=== 10 March ===
List of shipwrecks: 10 March 1927
Ship	State	Description
Fedelma	United Kingdom	The coaster ran aground in the River Parrett downstream of Bridgwater, Somerset. She was refloated on 16 March.
Servaux No.6	France	The tug sank at Marseille, Bouches-du-Rhône with the loss of a crew member.
Svanen	Sweden	The schooner came ashore at Larvik, Norway and was wrecked.

=== 11 March ===
List of shipwrecks: 11 March 1927
Ship	State	Description
El Sol	United States	The cargo ship collided with Sac City (United States) in New York Harbor and sank.
Kilcredane	United Kingdom	The cargo ship ran aground at Hakodate, Japan. She was refloated on 18 March.
Kirishima Maru	Japan	The training ship foundered in the Pacific Ocean 100 nautical miles (190 km) off Cape Inubō with the loss of all hands.

=== 13 March ===
List of shipwrecks: 13 March 1927
Ship	State	Description
Ines Fierro	Spain	The cargo ship ran aground at Llastres, Asturias and was wrecked. Her crew survived.

=== 15 March ===
List of shipwrecks: 15 March 1927
Ship	State	Description
Leyland	United Kingdom	The 117.4-foot (35.8 m), 236-ton steam trawler was wrecked in a gale on Horlisgeir Rock, South Uist, Outer Hebrides, Scotland. The crew reached shore 2 miles (3.2 km) away in her boat. Attempts at salvage were unsuccessful.

=== 16 March ===
List of shipwrecks: 16 March 1927
Ship	State	Description
Clint	United Kingdom	The cargo ship foundered at Montrose, Forfarshire. Her crew were rescued by Dunscore (United Kingdom).
Vendome	France	The cargo ship ran aground at Libreville, French West Africa. She was refloated on 23 March.

=== 18 March ===
List of shipwrecks: 18 March 1927
Ship	State	Description
Comandante Manoel Lourenco	Brazil	The cargo ship foundered at Ilha Grande, Piauí.
Hector	Germany	The cargo ship ran aground at Faro, Portugal. Salvage efforts were suspended on 19 March.

=== 19 March ===
List of shipwrecks: 19 March 1927
Ship	State	Description
Majestic IV	United Kingdom	The cargo ship foundered in the North Sea off Lindisfarne, Northumberland.

=== 20 March ===
List of shipwrecks: 20 March 1927
Ship	State	Description
Wakamiya Maru	Japan	The cargo ship was driven ashore at Choshi and was a total loss.

=== 23 March ===
List of shipwrecks: 23 March 1927
Ship	State	Description
Stig Gorthon	Sweden	The cargo ship collided with another vessel at Vegesack, Germany and was beached. She was later refloated and towed to Bremen.

=== 24 March ===
List of shipwrecks: 24 March 1927
Ship	State	Description
Europa	Netherlands	The dredger struck a submerged object and sank at Huelva, Andalusia, Spain.
Verdande	Norway	The cargo ship departed Cardiff, Glamorgan, United Kingdom for Las Palmas, Canary Islands, Spain. Five crew and two lifebelts and some lifeboats washed ashore at Boscastle and Bude, Cornwall, United Kingdom on 28 March. Believed foundered with the loss of all hands.

=== 26 March ===
List of shipwrecks: 26 March 1927
Ship	State	Description
Chevalier	United Kingdom	The cargo ship ran aground on Barmore Island, Argyllshire. She was refloated on 1 April.
Maria	Germany	The schooner was driven ashore at Simrishamn, Sweden and was wrecked with the loss of all hands.

=== 28 March ===
List of shipwrecks: 28 March 1927
Ship	State	Description
Fulmar	United Kingdom	The cargo ship collided with Rio Claro (United Kingdom) in the English Channel 1.5 nautical miles (2.8 km) off Dungeness, Kent and sank. Her crew survived.
General Maude	United Kingdom	The schooner was abandoned and set afire in the Atlantic Ocean. Her crew were rescued by Aztec (Norway).

=== 29 March ===
List of shipwrecks: 29 March 1927
Ship	State	Description
Sea Brand	United Kingdom	The schooner foundered in the Atlantic Ocean. All six crew were rescued by Ndolja (Sweden).
Steel Inventor	United States	The cargo ship ran aground on Old Providence Island, Colombia. She was refloated on 22 April.

=== 30 March ===
List of shipwrecks: 30 March 1927
Ship	State	Description
Cairnhill	United Kingdom	The cargo ship ran aground at Matanzas, Cuba. She was refloated on 2 April.

=== Unknown date ===
List of shipwrecks: unknown date March 1927
Ship	State	Description
Oliver Ellsworth	United States	The steamer was sunk by a boiler explosion in Long Island Sound. One person was killed.

== April ==
=== 1 April ===
List of shipwrecks: 1 April 1927
Ship	State	Description
Beatty Rose	United Kingdom	The collier foundered off the Casquets, Channel Islands. All thirteen crew were rescued.
Gandara	United Kingdom	The cargo liner ran aground at Point Cires, Spanish Morocco. She was refloated on 5 April.
Jacinto	Spain	The cargo ship collided with Author (United Kingdom) in the Atlantic Ocean off Gibraltar and sank. Seven crew were rescued by Author.
Louis Pasteur	France	The schooner foundered in the English Channel off Cherbourg, Manche with the loss of all hands.
Neville	United Kingdom	The collier foundered in the Atlantic Ocean off Land's End, Cornwall. All thirteen crew were rescued by Teelin Head (United Kingdom).

=== 5 April ===
List of shipwrecks: 5 April 1927
Ship	State	Description
Unkai Maru No.3	Japan	The cargo ship was abandoned in the East China Sea. Although she was presumed to have subsequently foundered, she was later discovered still afloat. She came ashore at Hinomisaki on 8 April.

=== 6 April ===
List of shipwrecks: 6 April 1927
Ship	State	Description
Tjileboet	Netherlands	The cargo ship ran aground on Lingting Island, Hong Kong. Her bow section was cut off and the ship was refloated on 28 April.

=== 8 April ===
List of shipwrecks: 8 April 1927
Ship	State	Description
Hamlet	South Africa	The coaster came ashore in Saldanha Bay. She broke her back and was a total loss.
Ida	Germany	The auxiliary sailing vessel was struck by Siretul (Romania) at Hamburg and sank.
Nellie	United States	The 59-ton schooner stranded on Cape Chignecto, Bay of Fundy.

=== 9 April ===
List of shipwrecks: 9 April 1927
Ship	State	Description
Latona	Canada	The cargo ship sank in a collision with Lucille near Long Shoal, Lunenburg, Nova Scotia.
Lucille	unknown	The ship sank in a collision with Latona (Canada) near Long Shoal, Lunenburg, Nova Scotia.

=== 11 April ===
List of shipwrecks: 11 April 1927
Ship	State	Description
Fred W. Thurlow	United States	The schooner foundered near Highland Light, Cape Cod, Massachusetts.

=== 12 April ===
List of shipwrecks: 12 April 1927
Ship	State	Description
Balto	Norway	The cargo ship was driven ashore at Melilla, Spanish Morocco and wrecked. Her crew survived. She was refloated on 3 August.
Castilla	Spain	The hospital ship was driven ashore at Melilla and was wrecked. Her crew survived.
Collingdale	United Kingdom	The cargo ship was driven ashore at Melilla and was wrecked. All 28 crew were rescued after two days by a local motor boat. She was declared a total loss on 19 April.
Conte Verde	Italy	The ocean liner ran aground at Buenos Aires, Argentina. She was refloated the next day.
Nicolas Pateras	Greece	The cargo ship was driven ashore at Melilla and was abandoned. Her crew were rescued by the Melilla Lifeboat after two days. She was refloated on 16 May.

=== 13 April ===
List of shipwrecks: 13 April 1927
Ship	State	Description
Chocolita	Spain	The coaster foundered at Santander, Cantabria with the loss of eight of her nine crew.
Fina	Italy	The cargo ship came ashore on Kacova, Greece. She was refloated on 16 April.
Scotland Maru	Japan	The cargo ship struck rocks at Tathong Point, Hong Kong and was beached in Kowloon Bay. She was later refloated and arrived at Hong Kong on 19 April.

=== 14 April ===
List of shipwrecks: 14 April 1927
Ship	State	Description
Mariu	Italy	The cargo ship sprang a leak and sank in the Mediterranean Sea 6 nautical miles (11 km) south of Cape Camarat. Her crew survived.

=== 15 April ===
List of shipwrecks: 15 April 1927
Ship	State	Description
Christel Vinnen	Italy	The barque came ashore on Old Providence Island, Colombia and was wrecked. Her crew survived.

=== 17 April ===
List of shipwrecks: 17 April 1927
Ship	State	Description
Emmy L D	France	The cargo ship ran aground at Galata, Turkey. She was refloated on 20 April.
Riverina	United Kingdom	The passenger ship ran aground at Gabo. Her 250 passengers were taken off on 20 April.

=== 18 April ===
List of shipwrecks: 18 April 1927
Ship	State	Description
Wrestler	United Kingdom	The tug struck a rock at Freshwater, Isle of Wight and sank with the loss of two of her ten crew.

=== 21 April ===
List of shipwrecks: 21 April 1927
Ship	State	Description
Camano	United States	The four-masted schooner was driven ashore at San Juan, Puerto Rico and was wrecked.
Suez Maru	Japan	The cargo ship ran aground on the west coast of Sakhalin, Soviet Union. She was refloated on4 October.
Westland	United States	The cargo ship ran aground on a reef in Lake Huron. She was refloated on 1 May.

=== 26 April ===
List of shipwrecks: 26 April 1927
Ship	State	Description
Angeliki	Greece	The sailing ship sprang a leak and sank at Patras. She was refloated on 28 April. Subsequently repaired and returned to service.
Stanley Hall	United Kingdom	The cargo ship ran aground at Tanga, Tanganyika. She was refloated on 30 April.

=== 27 April ===
List of shipwrecks: 27 April 1927
Ship	State	Description
Henri Desmarais	France	The tanker ran aground at Cabo de Gata, Almeria, Spain. She was refloated on 1 May.

=== 30 April ===
List of shipwrecks: 30 April 1927
Ship	State	Description
USS Colorado	United States Navy	The Colorado-class battleship ran aground on Diamond Reef in the Hudson River, near the mouth of the East River, midway between Governors Island and The Battery.
Tasman	Netherlands	The cargo ship ran aground on Clerke Island, Queensland, Australia. She was refloated on 13 May.

== May ==
=== 2 May ===
List of shipwrecks: 2 May 1927
Ship	State	Description
Astoria	United States	The cargo ship ran aground in Grays Harbor and was abandoned by her crew. She was later refloated, repaired and returned to service.
Bessie C. Lake	United Kingdom	The schooner was driven ashore at Saint-Pierre, Saint Pierre and Miquelon and was wrecked. Her crew survived.
Monteceniso	Italy	The cargo ship ran aground in the Point Indio Channel, Buenos Aires, Argentina. She was refloated on 13 May.
Ryvarden	Norway	The cargo ship ran aground at Vila Real, Portugal. She was refloated on 10 May.

=== 3 May ===
List of shipwrecks: 3 May 1927
Ship	State	Description
Jack Frost	United Kingdom	The schooner was driven ashore at Port au Bras, Newfoundland and was wrecked.
Miyazaki Maru	Japan	The passenger ship ran aground at Kwarenko, Formosa. All on board were rescued. She broke in three on 1 June and was a total loss.
President Wittock	Belgium	The fishing boat struck a mine and sank in the North Sea off the Dutch coast. Her crew were rescued by the fishing smack Blencathra (United Kingdom).

=== 4 May ===
List of shipwrecks: 4 May 1927
Ship	State	Description
"Playmate"	United Kingdom	The sailing trawler was dismasted on 2 May. She was spotted 24 miles off Douglas, Isle of Man some hours later by Asgerd (Norway) who rescued her 2 crewmembers who were near death. Trawler "Peter Lovett" (United Kingdom) spotted the derelict vessel on 4 May 10 miles off Maughold Head, Isle of Man, but abandoned an effort to tow her. She sank later that day during an attempt to tow by trawler "J Baels-Mauricx" (United Kingdom).

=== 8 May ===
List of shipwrecks: 8 May 1927
Ship	State	Description
Jacob Luckenbach	United States	The cargo ship ran aground at Point Guinos, Costa Rica. She was refloated on 17 May.

=== 10 May ===
List of shipwrecks: 10 May 1927
Ship	State	Description
Everett Hays	United States	The 39-gross register ton steam auxiliary schooner struck a reef off Nikolski on Umnak Island in the Aleutian Islands and sank in a half gale and heavy seas. Her crew of seven survived. Wreck blown up 24 June with explosives by USCGC Unalga (United States Coast Guard).
Marietta Nominos	Greece	The cargo ship ran aground at the entrance to the Corinth Canal. She was refloated on 14 May.

=== 12 May ===
List of shipwrecks: 12 May 1927
Ship	State	Description
Delfina	United States	The cargo ship ran aground at San Pedro de Macorís, Dominican Republic. She was later refloated, and arrived at Boston, Massachusetts on 25 May.

=== 18 May ===
List of shipwrecks: 18 May 1927
Ship	State	Description
Athena	Italy	The cargo ship foundered in the Mediterranean Sea 1 nautical mile (1.9 km) off Sète, Hérault, France. Her crew were rescued.
Karado Maru	Japan	The cargo ship came ashore at Nemuro, Hokkaidō and was wrecked.
Ysseldijk	Netherlands	The cargo ship ran aground in the Paraná River 12 nautical miles (22 km) upstream of Rosario, Argentina. She was refloated on 28 May.

=== 19 May ===
List of shipwrecks: 19 May 1927
Ship	State	Description
Indiana Harbor	United States	The cargo ship came ashore on the Rodgers Reef, Gorda Point. She was abandoned as a total loss on 20 May. Her crew were rescued.
West Irmo	United States	The cargo ship ran aground at Calabar, Nigeria. She was refloated on 24 May.

=== 22 May ===
List of shipwrecks: 22 May 1927
Ship	State	Description
Ostsee	Germany	The cargo ship was driven ashore at Point Cires, Spanish Morocco. She was still aground on 29 May, when a salvage tug arrived.

=== 23 May ===
List of shipwrecks: 23 May 1927
Ship	State	Description
Amiral Jauréguiberry	France	The cargo ship ran aground at Pauillac, Gironde. She was refloated on 26 May.
Kifune Maru No.5	Japan	The cargo ship ran aground on Moenaushi. She was refloated on 3 June.
Sekkai Maru	Japan	The cargo ship collided with Daitoru Maru (Japan) at Shimonoseki and was beached.
Tacoma Maru	Japan	The cargo ship ran aground on Iki Island. She was refloated on 31 May.

=== 25 May ===
List of shipwrecks: 25 May 1927
Ship	State	Description
Big Jimsie	United Kingdom	The schooner was driven ashore at Moenaushi, Sakhalin, Soviet Union and was a total loss.
Thomas R. Buckham	United States	The cargo ship struck a bridge at Simmesport, Louisiana and sank in the Atchafalaya River.

=== 28 May ===
List of shipwrecks: 28 May 1927
Ship	State	Description
Ekaterina C	Greece	The cargo ship ran aground in the Martin Garcia Channel. She was still aground on 18 July.
Negros	Philippines	The passenger ferry foundered in a typhoon with the loss of 108 of the 178 people on board.

=== 30 May ===
List of shipwrecks: 30 May 1927
Ship	State	Description
Borée	France	The schooner was abandoned in the Atlantic Ocean (47°51′N 9°58′W). Her crew were rescued by Aquarius (United States).

=== 31 May ===
List of shipwrecks: 31 May 1927
Ship	State	Description
Baltanic	United Kingdom	The cargo ship ran aground on Surop, off Reval, Estonia. She was refloated on 2 June.
Okinawa Maru	Japan	The cargo ship ran aground at Gyeryuto, Korea and sank.

== June ==
=== 4 June ===
List of shipwrecks: 4 June 1927
Ship	State	Description
City of Nome	United States	The cargo ship was destroyed by fire at Aberdeen, Washington.
Clan Macintyre	United Kingdom	The cargo ship ran aground in the Paraná River, Argentina. She was refloated on 11 June.

=== 9 June ===
List of shipwrecks: 9 June 1927
Ship	State	Description
Abron	United States	The cargo ship ran aground on Old Providence Island, Colombia. She was refloated on 17 June.
Kenkon Maru No.5	Japan	The cargo ship ran aground at Mombetsu, Hokkaidō. She was refloated on 15 June.

=== 10 June ===
List of shipwrecks: 10 June 1927
Ship	State	Description
Touraco	United Kingdom	The coaster ran aground in Little Vasa Water, Orkney Islands. She was refloated on 16 June.

=== 11 June ===
List of shipwrecks: 11 June 1927
Ship	State	Description
Martaban	United Kingdom	The cargo ship ran aground in the Paraná River, Argentina. She was refloated on 16 June.

=== 12 June ===
List of shipwrecks: 12 June 1927
Ship	State	Description
Bluestone	United Kingdom	The cargo ship capsized in the Beryozovye Islands, Soviet Union. Her crew were rescued. She was later raised and sold.

=== 13 June ===
List of shipwrecks: 13 June 1927
Ship	State	Description
Kumano Maru	Japan	The cargo liner collided with Yamashiro Maru (Japan) at Kobe and was beached. All on board were rescued.

=== 14 June ===
List of shipwrecks: 14 June 1927
Ship	State	Description
Hollandia	Netherlands	The schooner capsized in the Atlantic Ocean (13°25′N 70°13′W) whilst under tow of Melilla (Germany). Her crew were rescued but she was declared a total loss.

=== 15 June ===
List of shipwrecks: 15 June 1927
Ship	State	Description
Kumano Maru	Japan	The cargo ship collided with another vessel off Takamatsu and was beached.
Sumino-o Maru	Japan	The coaster collided with Taizan Maru (Japan) in the Tsugaru Strait and sank.

=== 20 June ===
List of shipwrecks: 20 June 1927
Ship	State	Description
Craster Hall	United States	The cargo ship collided with Reginolite (Canada) at Talara, Peru and was beached.

=== 23 June ===
List of shipwrecks: 23 June 1927
Ship	State	Description
Ozark	United States	The cargo ship collided with the trawler Surge (United States) at Boston, Massachusetts, or 22 miles (35 km) south east of Nauset Light, Cape Cod. Ozark was beached.
Surge	United States	The fishing steamer was sunk in a collision with Ozark (United States) 22 miles (35 km) south east of Nauset Light, Cape Cod. Three crewmen killed.

=== 26 June ===
List of shipwrecks: 26 June 1927
Ship	State	Description
Cevic	United Kingdom	The 106-foot (32 m), 151-ton steam trawler dragged anchor onto a sand bank in rough seas, eventually being driven on to Half Tide Rock in Ramsey Bay. The crew were rescued by Mathew Simpson. The vessel was declared a total loss on 30 June. Eventually broke up.

=== 27 June ===
List of shipwrecks: 27 June 1927
Ship	State	Description
Birkdale	United Kingdom	The barque caught fire off Diego de Almagro Island, Chile on 24 June, and was a total loss when she ran aground on the island Islas Lobos, in the Nelson Strait three days later. Six of her twenty crew were lost. Survivors were rescued by Porvenir (Chilean Navy).

=== 29 June ===
List of shipwrecks: 29 June 1927
Ship	State	Description
Felicité	France	The schooner was driven ashore at Tors Cove, Newfoundland and was abandoned by her crew.
Sina	Latvia	The cargo ship was destroyed by fire at Riga.

== July ==
=== 1 July ===
List of shipwrecks: 1 July 1927
Ship	State	Description
Robert C Wente	United States	The cargo ship was destroyed by fire in the St. Clare River, Chicago, Illinois.
Masuren	Germany	The coaster ran aground in the River Parrett at Bridgwater, Somerset, United Kingdom. She was refloated on 4 July.

=== 2 July ===
List of shipwrecks: 2 July 1927
Ship	State	Description
Chi Chuen	China	The cargo ship ran aground in the Yangtze 32 nautical miles (59 km) upstream of Ichang. She was refloated on 10 July.
St. François Xavier	France	The passenger ship came ashore on Spratly Island, Vietnam. All on board were rescued.

=== 3 July ===
List of shipwrecks: 3 July 1927
Ship	State	Description
Kyphissia	Greece	The cargo ship ran aground at Willemstad, Curaçao and Dependencies. She was refloated on 9 July.
Nuten	United States	The 22-gross register ton motor vessel was destroyed while moored at Nushagak, Territory of Alaska, by a fire that began in her galley stove. All three people aboard survived.

=== 4 July ===
List of shipwrecks: 4 July 1927
Ship	State	Description
Nephrite	United Kingdom	The cargo ship ran aground off Derrybeg, County Donegal, Ireland. Her crew were rescued.

=== 5 July ===
List of shipwrecks: 5 July 1927
Ship	State	Description
Mary Grace	United Kingdom	The schooner foundered in the Pentland Firth off Swona. Her crew were rescued.
Presidente Saavedra	Bolivia	The cargo ship sank at Buenos Aires, Argentina. She was refloated on 12 July.

=== 7 July ===
List of shipwrecks: 7 July 1927
Ship	State	Description
Aster	France	The cargo ship ran aground at Foundiougne, French West Africa. She was refloated on 13 July.
Gloria Swanson	Canada	The 19 ton schooner suffered an explosion, caught fire, and sank in the Atlantic Ocean off the Canadian coast near Bettys Island, Nova Scotia.

=== 8 July ===
List of shipwrecks: 8 July 1927
Ship	State	Description
Westowrie	United Kingdom	The coaster collided with Lambeth (United Kingdom) in the North Sea off Whitby, Yorkshire and sank. All six crew were rescued by Chartered (United Kingdom).

=== 9 July ===
List of shipwrecks: 9 July 1927
Ship	State	Description
Boa Viagem	Portugal	The tug sprang a leak and was abandoned. Her crew were rescued by Benguela (Portugal).

=== 13 July ===
List of shipwrecks: 13 July 1927
Ship	State	Description
Margaret	Canada	The ship ran aground in the Magdalen Islands, Quebec and was a total loss.
Western Lass	United Kingdom	The schooner came ashore on the Brison Rocks, off Cape Cornwall and was a total loss. Her crew survived.

=== 14 July ===
List of shipwrecks: 14 July 1927
Ship	State	Description
Shahzada	United Kingdom	The cargo ship sprang a leak in the Bay of Bengal 50 nautical miles (93 km) off Sandheads, West Bengal, India and sank with the loss of 21 of her 72 crew. Survivors were rescued by Clintonia (United Kingdom).

=== 15 July ===
List of shipwrecks: 15 July 1927
Ship	State	Description
Iowa	United States	The 12-gross register ton motor vessel was destroyed by fire at Ketchikan, Territory of Alaska.
Sagaland	Norway	The cargo ship collided with Veendam (Netherlands) in the Atlantic Ocean 4 nautical miles (7.4 km) east Nantucket, Massachusetts and sank with the loss of a crew member.

=== 16 July ===
List of shipwrecks: 16 July 1927
Ship	State	Description
Lutetia	France	The cargo ship sank at Saint-Nazaire, Loire-Inférieure. She was refloated on 25 July.

=== 19 July ===
List of shipwrecks: 19 July 1927
Ship	State	Description
Olga	United States	The 8-gross register ton fishing vessel was wrecked on the northwest end of Hump Island (58°27′30″N 134°59′00″W) in Lynn Canal in Southeast Alaska after her steering gear broke and her gasoline engine failed.

=== 20 July ===
List of shipwrecks: 20 July 1927
Ship	State	Description
Empirestar	United Kingdom	The cargo ship ran aground in the Uruguay River downstream of Fray Bentos, Uruguay. She was refloated on 24 July.
Gerda	Sweden	The brig was abandoned by her crew. She was discovered derelict 2 nautical miles (3.7 km) south west of the Svenska Bjorn Lightship (Sweden) by Trolleholm (Sweden).
Toto Maru	Japan	The cargo ship was wrecked on the west coast of the Kamchatka Peninsula, Soviet Union. Her crew were rescued by an Imperial Japanese Navy destroyer.

=== 21 July ===
List of shipwrecks: 21 July 1927
Ship	State	Description
Carspey	United Kingdom	The cargo ship ran aground in the Banana Creek, Congo River. She was refloated on 2 August.
Chios	Greece	The cargo ship collided with Rafaello (Italy) at Istanbul, Turkey and was beached. She was refloated on 26 July.
Homestead	United States	The cargo ship was abandoned off the Laccadive Islands, India. Her crew were rescued by Aungban (United Kingdom).

=== 23 July ===
List of shipwrecks: 23 July 1927
Ship	State	Description
Bayrupert	United Kingdom	The cargo liner struck an uncharted rock near Cape Harrigan, Labrador, Canada (55°59′N 59°59′W) and was wrecked. All on board survived. She was declared a total loss on 3 August.
Rose	United Kingdom	The cargo ship sprang a leak and was beached at Holyhead, Anglesey.

=== 26 July ===
List of shipwrecks: 26 July 1927
Ship	State	Description
Majestic	United Kingdom	The paddle steamer sank at Baltimore, Ohio.

=== 27 July ===
List of shipwrecks: 27 July 1927
Ship	State	Description
Mikkidura	United States	The 10-gross register ton auxiliary schooner was destroyed by fire while at anchor in Barlow Cove (58°24′N 134°55′W) in Southeast Alaska. The two people aboard survived.

=== 28 July ===
List of shipwrecks: 28 July 1927
Ship	State	Description
Celticstar	United Kingdom	The cargo ship ran aground in the Uruguay River downstream of Fray Bentos, Uruguay. She was refloated on 4 August.
Favorite	United States	The passenger vessel was struck by a squall causing her to roll on her port side, fill and sink in Lake Michigan one-half mile (0.80 km) off North Avenue, Chicago. 27 passengers drowned.
Mary E. Sultan	United Kingdom	The schooner was driven ashore at Port Royal, Jamaica and was wrecked.

=== 30 July ===
List of shipwrecks: 30 July 1927
Ship	State	Description
Admiral Watson	United States	The cargo ship ran aground in Milbanke Sound, British Columbia, Canada. She was still aground on 4 August, but was expected to be refloated within a week.
Oscar Midling	United Kingdom	The cargo ship ran aground in the Ibicuy Islands, Argentina. She was refloated on 4 August.
San Fraterno	United Kingdom	The tanker struck rocks at Bonet Island, Strait of Magellan and sank. Her crew were rescued by Inverarder (United Kingdom).

== August ==
=== 3 August ===
List of shipwrecks: 3 August 1927
Ship	State	Description
Silver City	United Kingdom	The cargo ship struck rocks in Domino Run, between the Island of Ponds and Spotted Island, Labrador and was beached at Domino Harbour. She was refloated on 6 August.

=== 5 August ===
List of shipwrecks: 5 August 1927
Ship	State	Description
Chiyoda	Imperial Japanese Navy	The decommissioned cruiser was sunk as a gunnery target in the Bungo Channel by the heavy cruiser Furutaka (Imperial Japanese Navy).
O-2	Imperial Japanese Navy	An American merchant ship sighted the derelict hulk of the Type U-43 submarine – which had foundered off Japan in a storm on 21 April 1925 – floating in the Pacific Ocean west of Oahu, Hawaii. The hulk subsequently was scuttled. (Some sources claim O-2 was scrapped in 1922.)
Stad Vlaardingen	Netherlands	The cargo ship ran aground at La Plata, Argentina. She was refloated on 12 August.

=== 6 August ===
List of shipwrecks: 6 August 1927
Ship	State	Description
Elterwater	United Kingdom	The cargo ship ran aground south of Carr Point, Lothian. It was reported on 16 August that she was thought to have broken her back, but this proved not to be the case.

=== 7 August ===
List of shipwrecks: 7 August 1927
Ship	State	Description
Ben Read	United Kingdom	The tanker ran aground near Robin Hood's Bay, Yorkshire. She was refloated on 12 August but had to be beached. Ben Read was refloated again on 14 August.

=== 8 August ===
List of shipwrecks: 8 August 1927
Ship	State	Description
Rafael Nunez	Spain	The cargo ship sank at Herida, Murcia.

=== 12 August ===
List of shipwrecks: 12 August 1927
Ship	State	Description
Ansonia	United States	Prohibition in the United States: The rum running cargo ship was intercepted at Staten Island, New York by a United States Coast Guard vessel. She rammed and sank a sand barge before running aground on a sandbank.
Burlington	United States	The cargo ship sank at Cleveland, Ohio.

=== 13 August ===
List of shipwrecks: 13 August 1927
Ship	State	Description
Granite City	United Kingdom	The tug foundered in the River Tyne at Blaydon, Northumberland.
Sicily	United Kingdom	The cargo ship ran aground in the Paraná River, Argentina. She was refloated on 2 September.

=== 14 August ===
List of shipwrecks: 14 August 1927
Ship	State	Description
Mission	United States	The 13-gross register ton motor vessel caught fire after a hand lantern ignited gasoline in her bilge, then exploded and sank in 132 feet (40 m) of water 2 nautical miles (3.7 km; 2.3 mi) south of Burnett Cannery – probably now Cannery Point (56°04′N 132°29′W) in Burnett Inlet – in Southeast Alaska. Her crew abandoned ship in a dinghy and survived even though the dinghy was only 15 feet (4.6 m) from Mission at the time of the explosion.

=== 15 August ===
List of shipwrecks: 15 August 1927
Ship	State	Description
Sambre	United Kingdom	The cargo ship struck an uncharted rock at Vitória, Brazil and was beached. She was refloated on 4 September.
Sumidagawa Maru	Japan	The cargo ship ran aground at Yenryumisaki. She later broke up and salvage efforts were abandoned on 6 September.

=== 17 August ===
List of shipwrecks: 17 August 1927
Ship	State	Description
Cherry Branch	United Kingdom	The cargo ship ran aground on Green Island or Ship Island, Ecuador. She was refloated on 28 August and arrived at Guayaquil later that day.

=== 18 August ===
List of shipwrecks: 18 August 1927
Ship	State	Description
Hennepin	United States	The barge sprang a leak and sank in Lake Michigan.
Kibi Maru No.2	Japan	The coaster was driven ashore at Cape Mirabetsu, Sakhalin, Soviet Union and was severely damaged.

=== 19 August ===
List of shipwrecks: 19 August 1927
Ship	State	Description
Aransas	United States	The tug was destroyed by fire in Lake Pontchartrain.
Glofield	United Kingdom	The cargo ship sprang a leak and sank in the Paraná River, Buenos Aires, Argentina.
Marionga D. Thermiotis	Greece	The cargo ship caught fire at Corcubión, A Coruña, Spain. She was abandoned by her crew on 21 August, sinking later that day. The fire was extinguished on 24 August.

=== 20 August ===
List of shipwrecks: 20 August 1927
Ship	State	Description
Eros	United Kingdom	The cargo ship came ashore in Foal Bay, Jamaica. She was refloated on 26 August.
R L Mackenzie	Canada	The 33 ton schooner caught fire, and sank in the Atlantic Ocean off Halifax, Nova Scotia.
Teseo	Italy	The cargo ship ran aground in the Paraná River at Punta Indio, Argentina. She was refloated on 1 September.

=== 21 August ===
List of shipwrecks: 21 August 1927
Ship	State	Description
Adana C.	Canada	The steamer ran aground at Louisbourg, Nova Scotia.
Oliva	Canada	The 23 ton sailing vessel foundered off Flint Island, Nova Scotia.

=== 22 August ===
List of shipwrecks: 22 August 1927
Ship	State	Description
Nellie	Sweden	The cargo ship foundered in the Baltic Sea. Her crew were rescued by Trudvang (Norway).
Prince Rupert	Canada	The passenger ship ran aground on Ripple Rock in the Seymour Narrows in the Discovery Passage in British Columbia, Canada. The steamer Cardena (Canada) pulled her off and towed her into port. Prince Rupert was repaired and returned to service.

=== 24 August ===
List of shipwrecks: 24 August 1927
Ship	State	Description
Aguia Acoreana	Portugal	The schooner caught fire in the Atlantic Ocean (48°24′N 7°20′W) and was abandoned. Her crew were rescued by Tuscany (United Kingdom).
Clayton Walters or Clayton W. Walters	Canada	1927 Nova Scotia hurricane: The fishing schooner was wrecked off Sable Island, Nova Scotia. Lost with all 21 hands.
Columbia	United States	1927 Nova Scotia hurricane: The fishing schooner sank in a gale, possibly off Sable Island, Nova Scotia. Lost with all 22 hands.
Edward S. Falt	Canada	1927 Nova Scotia hurricane: The schooner was wrecked at River Bourgeois, Nova Scotia.
Equitable	Canada	1927 Nova Scotia hurricane: The schooner burned off Lunenburg, Nova Scotia.
Florence May	Canada	1927 Nova Scotia hurricane: The 10-ton sailing vessel was sunk in a collision with Nellie J. King (flag unknown) at North Sydney, Nova Scotia.
G. B. Zwicker	Canada	1927 Nova Scotia hurricane: The motor vessel ran aground off Cherry Hill.
Haligonian	Canada	1927 Nova Scotia hurricane: The fishing schooner was lost in a hurricane. Lost with all hands.
Hattie McKay	Canada	1927 Nova Scotia hurricane: The schooner dragged anchor in a hurricane and was driven ashore at Medford, Nova Scotia, Minas Basin and broke in two, a total loss.
John C. Loughlin	Canada	1927 Nova Scotia hurricane: The schooner was lost in Placentia Bay, Nova Scotia. 23 to 28 crew lost.
John Halifax	Canada	1927 Nova Scotia hurricane: The sailing vessel ran aground off Sydney, Nova Scotia.
Joyce M. Smith or Joyce Smith	Canada	1927 Nova Scotia hurricane: The schooner was wrecked off Sable Island, Nova Scotia. Lost with all 24 hands.
Mahala	Canada	1927 Nova Scotia hurricane: The schooner was wrecked off Sable Island, Nova Scotia. Lost with all 20 hands.
Minas Princess	Canada	1927 Nova Scotia hurricane: The sailing vessel was lost off the South Channel of Nova Scotia.
No. 1	Canada	1927 Nova Scotia hurricane: The 183-ton sailing vessel, or dredge, sank off a dry dock at Halifax, Nova Scotia.
Nellie King	unknown	The schooner sailing vessel was sunk in a collision with Florence May (Canada) at North Sydney, Nova Scotia.
Northern Light	United States	The cargo ship was destroyed by fire at Mobile, Alabama.
Uda F. Corkum or Uda L. Corkum	Canada	1927 Nova Scotia hurricane: The schooner sank off Sable Island, Nova Scotia. Lost with all 19 hands.
Warabi	Imperial Japanese Navy	The Momi-class destroyer was rammed and sunk in the Mihogaseki Bight four miles (6.4 km) east of Jizo Zaki lighthouse, Shimane Prefecture 20 nautical miles (37 km) north east of Mihonoseki by Jintsū (Imperial Japanese Navy) with the loss of 92 or 111 crew.

=== 25 August ===
List of shipwrecks: 25 August 1927
Ship	State	Description
Silarus	United Kingdom	The cargo ship collided with Almirante Jacquay (Brazil) in the Scheldt at Fort Sainte Marie and was beached. She was refloated on 26 August.

=== 26 August ===
List of shipwrecks: 26 August 1927
Ship	State	Description
Marcel Schiaffino	France	The cargo ship ran aground at Marseille, Bouches-du-Rhône. She was refloated on 3 September.
Mystery II	Canada	1927 Nova Scotia hurricane: The fishing schooner sank at Clattice Harbour, Newfoundland. Lost with four hands.
Noxall	United Kingdom	1927 Nova Scotia hurricane: The schooner collided with Veda M. Mckown (United Kingdom) and sank off St. John's, Newfoundland, in a hurricane with the loss of a crew member.
Stanley Hubley	Canada	1927 Nova Scotia hurricane: The fishing schooner was wrecked at Gabarus, Cape Breton Island. Lost with all four hands.

=== 27 August ===
List of shipwrecks: 27 August 1927
Ship	State	Description
McLaughlan	Canada	1927 Nova Scotia hurricane: The fishing schooner was wrecked in Placentia Bay. Lost with two hands.
Minas Prince	United Kingdom	The schooner was dismasted and sprang a leak in the Atlantic Ocean off the coast of Massachusetts, United States and was abandoned by her crew. She was later towed into Vineyard Haven by a United States Government vessel.
Niagara	United States	The vessel that caught fire, burned, and sank near Fortescue, New Jersey.
Philomena	United States	The cargo ship was driven ashore at Port au Port, Newfoundland and was wrecked.
Steingrim	Norway	The cargo ship ran aground off the Hellevik Lighthouse, Norway and was wrecked.

=== 28 August ===
List of shipwrecks: 28 August 1927
Ship	State	Description
Mirabella	Sweden	The cargo ship ran aground at Ilhéus, Brazil. She was aground for about a month, departing under tow for Rio de Janeiro, Brazil on 25 September.

=== 29 August ===
List of shipwrecks: 29 August 1927
Ship	State	Description
Annie Healey	Canada	1927 Nova Scotia hurricane: The fishing schooner was wrecked in Placentia Bay. Lost with all seven hands.
Annie Jane or Annie Jean	Canada	1927 Nova Scotia hurricane: The fishing schooner was wrecked off Ile aux Morts. Lost with all four hands.
Effie May or Ella	Canada	1927 Nova Scotia hurricane: The fishing schooner was wrecked off Rencontre West, Newfoundland. Lost with all six hands.
Eva L.H.	United Kingdom	1927 Nova Scotia hurricane: The auxiliary schooner was abandoned off Halifax, Nova Scotia, Canada and was a total loss.
Fair Helga	United Kingdom	The whaler sprang a leak and was abandoned 7 nautical miles (13 km) east of the mouth of the Durgaat River, South Africa. Her crew were rescued by Sandgate Castle (United Kingdom).
Hilda Gertrude	Canada	1927 Nova Scotia hurricane: The fishing schooner was lost off Rushoon. Lost with all eight hands.
John C. Loughlin	Canada	1927 Nova Scotia hurricane: The fishing schooner was wrecked in Placentia Bay. Lost with all four or seven hands.
Loretta	Canada	1927 Nova Scotia hurricane: The fishing schooner was wrecked in Placentia Bay. Lost with all four hands.
Marie Maersk	Denmark	The cargo ship ran aground at Nuevitas, Cuba. She was refloated on 2 September.
Valena	Canada	1927 Nova Scotia hurricane: The fishing schooner was wrecked in Placentia Bay. Lost with all four hands.
Vienna	Canada	1927 Nova Scotia hurricane: The fishing schooner was wrecked in Placentia Bay. Lost with all four or six hands.

=== 30 August ===
List of shipwrecks: 30 August 1927
Ship	State	Description
Calcutta	Netherlands	The cargo ship collided with Rabenfels (Germany) at Diamond Harbour, India. She broke in two and was a total loss. Clan Mackellar (United Kingdom) ran aground avoiding the other ships. She was refloated the next day.
Fulton	Denmark	The schooner capsized at Rostock, Mecklenburg, Germany. Her crew were rescued.

=== 31 August ===
List of shipwrecks: 31 August 1927
Ship	State	Description
Branksea	United Kingdom	The cargo ship ran aground at Start Point, Devon. She was refloated on 8 September.
Nuestra Senhora de Begona	Spain	The cargo ship ran aground at Manila, Philippines and was wrecked.

=== Unknown date ===
List of shipwrecks: Unknown August 1927
Ship	State	Description
Sligo	Canada	1927 Nova Scotia hurricane: The schooner was wrecked near Halifax, Nova Scotia between 22–29 August. Two crew were lost.

== September ==
=== 3 September ===
List of shipwrecks: 3 September 1927
Ship	State	Description
Amicizia	Italy	The cargo ship was destroyed by fire at Augusta, Sicily.
Dominic	United Kingdom	The cargo ship ran aground in the Amazon River at Matura, Brazil. She was refloated on 18 September.
Parkhill	United Kingdom	The cargo ship capsized at Almeria, Andalusia, Spain.

=== 6 September ===
List of shipwrecks: 6 September 1927
Ship	State	Description
Grenadier	United Kingdom	The mail boat was severely damaged by fire and sank at Oban, Argyllshire. She was refloated on 13 September.
Inga	Sweden	The cargo ship was rammed by Maj (Sweden) at Burntisland, Fife and sank.
Jinsho Maru	Japan	The cargo ship ran aground on the east coast of Sakhalin, Soviet Union. She broke up in December, salvage being reported on 14 December as having been abandoned.

=== 7 September ===
List of shipwrecks: 7 September 1927
Ship	State	Description
Austri	Iceland	The trawler was wrecked off Vatnsnes, Iceland.

=== 9 September ===
List of shipwrecks: 9 September 1927
Ship	State	Description
Marie	Denmark	The schooner was wrecked at Gothenburg, Sweden. Her crew were rescued.
Mossa	United Kingdom	The cargo ship ran aground on the coast of New Guinea and was wrecked. Her crew were rescued by Durour (United Kingdom).

=== 10 September ===
List of shipwrecks: 10 September 1927
Ship	State	Description
Yselmonde	Netherlands	The cargo ship collided with Ellerdale (United Kingdom) in the Nieuwe Waterweg at Rotterdam, South Holland and sank.

=== 11 September ===
List of shipwrecks: 11 September 1927
Ship	State	Description
Kay & Em	Unknown	The schooner stranded near Wolfville, Nova Scotia, Canada.

=== 12 September ===
List of shipwrecks: 12 September 1927
Ship	State	Description
Fidelitas	Italy	The cargo ship ran aground at Norfolk, Virginia, United States. She was refloated on 19 September.

=== 13 September ===
List of shipwrecks: 13 September 1927
Ship	State	Description
Adriana	Italy	The cargo ship ran aground at Buenos Aires, Argentina. She was refloated on 16 September.

=== 14 September ===
List of shipwrecks: 14 September 1927
Ship	State	Description
Shinyei Maru No.3	Japan	The cargo ship ran aground off the Kinkasan Lighthouse, Miyagi. She was refloated on 3 December.

=== 16 September ===
List of shipwrecks: 16 September 1927
Ship	State	Description
Pinguino	Mexico	The tug foundered off Tampico, Tamaulipas with the loss of five lives.
Wusung	Japan	The steamship was reported lost near the Kuril Islands, with about 900 people killed.

=== 17 September ===
List of shipwrecks: 17 September 1927
Ship	State	Description
Strona	Norway	The cargo ship was driven ashore at Saudarkrok, Iceland and was wrecked.

=== 18 September ===
List of shipwrecks: 18 September 1927
Ship	State	Description
"Norina"	United Kingdom	The 125.2-foot (38.2 m), 270-ton trawler went aground on the Isle of Jura in fog and drizzle. Refloated on 21 September. She was repaired and returned to service.
Stranger	United States	The schooner caught fire in the Atlantic Ocean off Tampa, Florida and was abandoned. Her crew were rescued by Margaret (United States). She was towed into Tampa on 21 September.

=== 19 September ===
List of shipwrecks: 19 September 1927
Ship	State	Description
Norina	United Kingdom	The steam trawler ran aground in fog and drizzle on the Isle of Jura. Pulled off on 21 September.
Rio Negro	Germany	The cargo ship ran aground in the Paraná River, Argentina. She was refloated on 24 September.

=== 20 September ===
List of shipwrecks: 20 September 1927
Ship	State	Description
Bracondale	United Kingdom	The cargo ship ran aground on the Serrana Bank, Colombia. She was refloated on 23 September.

=== 21 September ===
List of shipwrecks: 21 September 1927
Ship	State	Description
Amersfoort	Netherlands	The cargo ship was driven ashore on Barbuda and was a total loss. Salvage operations were abandoned on 5 October.
Speedy	United Kingdom	The tug capsized and sank in the Alexandra Dock, Bombay, India. She was refloated the next day.

=== 22 September ===
List of shipwrecks: 22 September 1927
Ship	State	Description
Ludovic Mrazec	Romania	The cargo ship collided with Principele Barbu Stirbei (Romania) in the Dardanelles and sank. Her crew were rescued.

=== 24 September ===
List of shipwrecks: 24 September 1927
Ship	State	Description
San Pedro Goncalves	Portugal	The sailing ship was abandoned in the Atlantic Ocean (approximately 36°N 26°W). Fifteen crew were rescued by Perseo (Italy).
Terceirensh	Portugal	The schooner sank in the Atlantic Ocean 25 nautical miles (46 km) off Horta, Azores.

=== 25 September ===
List of shipwrecks: 25 September 1927
Ship	State	Description
Pirat	Spain	The tug was driven ashore at Gijón and wrecked.
Venturosa	Portugal	The sailing ship was driven ashore 6 nautical miles (11 km) south of Porto and was wrecked.

=== 27 September ===
List of shipwrecks: 27 September 1927
Ship	State	Description
Kennequhair	Canada	The dredger foundered off the coast of Labrador.
Linnea	United States	The 51 ton vessel caught fire, burned and sank in the Sacramento River at Sacramento, California.
Manuata	Canada	The schooner was wrecked near Gass Point, Nova Scotia, Canada.
Tartar	Norway	The cargo ship was driven ashore at Oslo, Norway. She was refloated on 30 September.

=== 29 September ===
List of shipwrecks: 29 September 1927
Ship	State	Description
Alco	United States	The 15-gross register ton motor vessel caught fire while fueling at Juneau, Territory of Alaska. The vessels Progress and Three Brothers (both United States) towed her to the nearest beach, where she burned to the waterline, a total loss. All five people on board Alco – three passengers and her crew of two – survived.
Bear Ridge	United States	The schooner barge sank near Hereford Inlet Light, New Jersey, or Delaware.

=== 30 September ===
List of shipwrecks: 30 September 1927
Ship	State	Description
Dimitrios N. Rallias	Greece	The cargo ship ran aground at Otchakoff, Soviet Union. She was refloated on 2 October.

=== Unknown date ===
List of shipwrecks: Unknown date September 1927
Ship	State	Description
Acushla	United States	The 10-gross register ton, 32.2-foot (9.8 m) fishing vessel was destroyed by fire in Cook Inlet on the south-central coast of the Territory of Alaska. The only person on board survived.

== October ==
=== 1 October ===
List of shipwrecks: 1 October 1927
Ship	State	Description
Punctum	Norway	The schooner departed Fredrikstad, Norway, for ports in the English Channel. Believed foundered in the Skaggerak with the loss of all hands. Wreckage from the ship washed up at Hirtshals, Denmark on 12 October.

=== 2 October ===
List of shipwrecks: 2 October 1927
Ship	State	Description
Burin	France	The schooner sprang a leak and was abandoned in the Atlantic Ocean (30°27′N 42°08′W). Her crew were rescued by Pennyworth (United Kingdom).
Lion	United Kingdom	The tug sank in the River Thames at Rotherhithe, London.

=== 3 October ===
List of shipwrecks: 3 October 1927
Ship	State	Description
HDMS Hermod	Royal Danish Navy	The fleet collier foundered in the North Sea off the west coast of Jutland with the loss of all 21 hands.
Sonja	Sweden	The cargo ship ran aground at Malo, 25 nautical miles (46 km) south of Gothenburg. She was refloated on 6 October.

=== 4 October ===
List of shipwrecks: 4 October 1927
Ship	State	Description
Quibdo	United Kingdom	The cargo ship sank in the Atrato River, Colombia, and was a total loss.

=== 5 October ===
List of shipwrecks: 5 October 1927
Ship	State	Description
E. R. Haggett	United States	The schooner barge sank near Brigantine, New Jersey.
Golden Rod	United States	The schooner caught fire in the Atlantic Ocean off the Bahamas and was abandoned. She came ashore on Mayaguana. Her crew survived.

=== 6 October ===
List of shipwrecks: 6 October 1927
Ship	State	Description
Favignana	Italy	The cargo ship collided with Gertrud (Finland) in the River Mersey, United Kingdom and was beached. She broke her back on 8 October. Her crew was rescued by the Mersey Flat Mersey (United Kingdom).

=== 8 October ===
List of shipwrecks: 8 October 1927
Ship	State	Description
Chester	United Kingdom	The cargo ship collided with Yorkshire Coast (United Kingdom) in the River Thames at Greenhithe, Kent and was beached.

=== 10 October ===
List of shipwrecks: 10 October 1927
Ship	State	Description
Michipicoten	United Kingdom	The cargo ship was destroyed by fire at Silverwater, New South Wales, Australia.
Nil	France	The cargo ship ran aground and was wrecked 5 nautical miles (9.3 km) east of Cape Vilano, Galicia, Spain.

=== 11 October ===
List of shipwrecks: 11 October 1927
Ship	State	Description
Ostsee	Germany	The cargo ship ran aground off Point Cires, Spanish Morocco. She was refloated on 25 June but was declared a constructive total loss.
Queen's County	Norway	The cargo ship collided with Luleå (Sweden) in the Nieuwe Waterweg at Rotterdam, Netherlands, and was beached. She was later refloated.
Tenkai Maru	Japan	The cargo ship ran aground at Qingdao, China. She was refloated on 17 October.

=== 12 October ===
List of shipwrecks: 12 October 1927
Ship	State	Description
Birk	Norway	The cargo ship ran aground on Old Providence Island, Colombia. She was refloated on 15 October.

=== 13 October ===
List of shipwrecks: 13 October 1927
Ship	State	Description
Glensanda	United Kingdom	The cargo ship ran aground at Punta Indio, Argentina. She was refloated on 17 October but ran aground again later that day. Glensanda was finally refloated on 25 October.

=== 14 October ===
List of shipwrecks: 14 October 1927
Ship	State	Description
Clara	United States	The 9-gross register ton fishing vessel was blown ashore and wrecked in Puffin Bay (56°15′30″N 134°48′00″W) on the coast of Baranof Island in the northern Alexander Archipelago in Southeast Alaska. The only person aboard survived.
Flowerdew	United Kingdom	The sailing ship sprang a leak in the Atlantic Ocean (31°56′N 73°27′W). She was set afire and abandoned by her crew, who were rescued by the steamer Brenta II (United Kingdom).
Mary S. L. Law	Unknown	The schooner barge burned and sank near Wolf Brook, Nova Scotia.
Professor Gruvel	Norway	The whale oil refining ship struck an iceberg and foundered in the Antarctic Ocean off the South Shetland Islands. Her crew survived.

=== 15 October ===
List of shipwrecks: 15 October 1927
Ship	State	Description
Maurice R. Thurlow	United States	The schooner ran aground on the Diamond Shoals off the coast of North Carolina and was wrecked.

=== 16 October ===
List of shipwrecks: 16 October 1927
Ship	State	Description
Besseggen	Norway	The cargo ship was rammed and sunk at New York, United States by Paris (France) with the loss of six crew. Survivors were rescued by Paris and the ferries American Legion and Brooklyn (both United States).
Hilde	Germany	The schooner foundered in the Baltic Sea. Her crew were rescued.
Minneapolis	United States	The 20-gross register ton single-masted fishing vessel sank in a gale and snowstorm in Halibut Cove (59°37′N 151°14′W) in Cook Inlet on the south-central coast of the Territory of Alaska. Her crew of six survived.

=== 17 October ===
List of shipwrecks: 17 October 1927
Ship	State	Description
Alexandros	Greece	The cargo ship ran aground off Lobos Island, Canary Islands, Spain. She was refloated on 23 October.
Burutu	United Kingdom	The cargo ship ran aground in the Sherbro River, Sierra Leone. She was refloated on 23 October.
Emilie L D	France	The cargo ship ran aground at Sardinero, Cantabria, Spain and was a total loss.
Nile	United States	The cargo ship ran aground 10 nautical miles (19 km) east of Cape Bougaroni, Algeria. She was abandoned as a total loss on 19 October.
Redhand	United Kingdom	The cargo ship capsized in Liverpool Bay. Her crew survived.

=== 19 October ===
List of shipwrecks: 19 October 1927
Ship	State	Description
Irene	United Kingdom	Irene Incident: The passenger ship was hijacked by pirates and sailed to Bias Bay. In an anti-piracy operation she was shelled and sunk by HMS L4 and HMS L5 (both Royal Navy) with the loss of at least one life with fourteen of her 258 passengers reported missing. Survivors were rescued by L4 and L5. Irene was subsequently salvaged, repaired and returned to service.
Vulcano	Italy	The cargo ship collided with Union (France) off Father Point, Quebec, Canada and sank. Her crew were rescued.

=== 22 October ===
List of shipwrecks: 22 October 1927
Ship	State	Description
Coos Bay	United States	The cargo ship ran aground at the entrance to San Francisco Bay. She was a total loss.
Horatio G. Foss	United States	The schooner foundered in the Atlantic Ocean 200 nautical miles (370 km) off Bermuda. All eight crew were rescued by Volendam (Netherlands).
Karin	United Kingdom	The coaster capsized and sank at Durban, South Africa.

=== 23 October ===
List of shipwrecks: 23 October 1927
Ship	State	Description
Elizabeth Freeman	United States	The four-masted schooner caught fire in the Atlantic Ocean of Jacksonville, Florida and was a total loss. Her crew were rescued by Scythian (United Kingdom).
Louvain	France	The cargo ship ran aground at Rosario, Brazil. She was refloated on 5 November.

=== 24 October ===
List of shipwrecks: 24 October 1927
Ship	State	Description
Constance	United States	The 15-gross register ton motor vessel was wrecked on an uncharted rock at the entrance to Last Chance Harbor (57°28′N 133°55′W) in Gambier Bay (57.4802778°N 134.0230556°W) in Southeast Alaska. Her wreck later was towed off the rock and its gasoline engine was salvaged.
Emlynmor	United Kingdom	The coaster passed Dungeness, Kent bound for Pembroke. No further trace, presumed foundered with the loss of all hands.
West Wales	United Kingdom	The cargo ship ran aground in the Paraná River, Argentina. She was refloated on 9 November.

=== 25 October ===
List of shipwrecks: 25 October 1927
Ship	State	Description
Astoria	United States	The auxiliary sailing vessel came ashore at Canso, Nova Scotia, Canada. She was refloated on 1 November.
Principessa Mafalda	Italy	The passenger liner broke a propeller shaft in the Atlantic Ocean 90 nautical miles (170 km) off the Abrolhos Archipelago, Brazil (16°56′S 37°46′W). She sank slowly in the presence of rescue vessels, however panic among the passengers and crew resulted in the deaths of 314 of 1,258 aboard. Survivors were rescued by Alhena (Netherlands), Avelona, Empire Star, Rosetti (all United Kingdom) and Formose (France).

=== 26 October ===
List of shipwrecks: 26 October 1927
Ship	State	Description
Georg	Norway	The cargo ship sprang a leak and sank in the Skagerrak 25 nautical miles (46 km) north of Skagen, Denmark. Her crew were rescued by a Danish fishing vessel.
Santa Rosa	United States	The schooner sprang a leak in the Atlantic Ocean (40°20′N 64°10′W). She was set afire and abandoned by her crew, who were rescued by Canadian Transporter (United Kingdom).
Stranger	United States	During a voyage from Ketchikan to Kake in Southeast Alaska, the 9-gross register ton, 42-foot (13 m) fishing vessel sank in a storm at the southern entrance to Rocky Pass (56°40′N 133°44′W). Her crew of four survived.

=== 27 October ===
List of shipwrecks: 27 October 1927
Ship	State	Description
Birger Jarl	Sweden	The passenger ship ran aground at Mariehamn, Finland. Her passengers were taken off and landed at Turku.
Helmsman	United Kingdom	The coaster departed the River Medway for the River Tees. No further trace, presumed foundered in the North Sea with the loss of all hands.
Ibaro	Italy	The cargo ship ran aground on the Scilly Rock, Isles of Scilly, United Kingdom and was wrecked with the loss of six of her 38 crew.
Loop Head	United Kingdom	The coaster departed Barry, Glamorgan for Limerick, Ireland. No further trace, presumed foundered in the Irish Sea with the loss of all hands.

=== 28 October ===
List of shipwrecks: 28 October 1927
Ship	State	Description
Craigavon	United Kingdom	The coaster departed from Glasgow, Renfrewshire on 26 October for Swansea, Glamorgan. She was reported off Milford Haven on this day. Presumed foundered in the Bristol Channel with the loss of all 14 crew.
Flora	United States	The 10-gross register ton motor vessel was destroyed by fire while moored at Petersburg, Territory of Alaska. Her crew of three survived.
Fortuna	Argentina	The sailing ship caught fire and sank in the Irish Sea 20 nautical miles (37 km) off the coast of Ireland with the loss of six of her 28 crew.
Scout	United States	A fire that started when her carburetor backfired destroyed the 11-gross register ton, 36.7-foot (11.2 m) fishing vessel while she was at anchor in Hole in the Wall, a strait in between San Lorenzo Island and island of Hole in the Wall (55°35′50″N 133°36′40″W) in Southeast Alaska. Her crew of two survived.

=== 29 October ===
List of shipwrecks: 29 October 1927
Ship	State	Description
Avalon	United States	The fishing schooner was rammed and sank by Presidente Wilson (Italy) in fog off Peaked Hill Bar. 11 crewmen were killed. Survivors were rescued by a United States Navy patrol craft and USCGC Burrows ( United States Coast Guard).
Clara	United Kingdom	The schooner was driven ashore at Kilmore Quay, County Wexford, Ireland and wrecked.
Sneyd	United Kingdom	The cargo ship ran aground at Swansea, Glamorgan. She was refloated on 8 November.

=== 30 October ===
List of shipwrecks: 30 October 1927
Ship	State	Description
Avalon	United States	The schooner was rammed and sunk by Presidente Wilson (Italy) in the Atlantic Ocean off Cape Cod, Massachusetts (42°09′N 70°02′W) with the loss of two of her five crew.
Ingomar	Finland	The barque was abandoned in the Baltic Sea (56°43′N 5°13′E). Her crew were rescued by Nanna Cords (Germany).
Kalo	Denmark	The cargo ship ran aground on Pienkalastaja Island, Vysotsk, Soviet Union and was wrecked.

== November ==
=== 2 November ===
List of shipwrecks: 2 November 1927
Ship	State	Description
Gornik	Poland	The tug foundered in the Baltic Sea 6 nautical miles (11 km) north west of Rixhöft, Vorpommern, Germany with the loss of nine of her ten crew.

=== 3 November ===
List of shipwrecks: 3 November 1927
Ship	State	Description
Greycliffe	Australia	Hull section of Greycliffe after it was dragged to Whiting Beach, Sydney Harbour. Greycliffe disaster: The ferry collided with Tahiti (New Zealand) in Sydney Harbour, New South Wales, Australia, and sank with the loss of 40 lives.

=== 4 November ===
List of shipwrecks: 4 November 1927
Ship	State	Description
Eurus	United States	The 15- or 18-gross register ton motor vessel sank 20 minutes after colliding with the cutter USCGC Unalga ( United States Coast Guard) in Dixon Harbor (58°20′15″N 136°52′00″W) in Southeast Alaska. After Eurus's engine had broken down in Cross Sound in the Alexander Archipelago near Cape Spencer, Unalga had towed her to Dixon Harbor, where the towline had parted, and Unalga was attempting to get a new towline to Eurus when the collision occurred. Unalga rescued Eurus's crew of two.
Möwe	Germany	The cargo ship struck a mine and sank in the Baltic Sea off Saaremaa, Estonia.
Valleluce	Italy	The cargo ship ran aground on Crane Island, Quebec, Canada.

=== 5 November ===
List of shipwrecks: 5 November 1927
Ship	State	Description
Jarstein	Norway	The cargo ship foundered off the north coast of Iceland with the loss of a crew member. Survivors were rescued by a British trawler.
Saltoun	United Kingdom	The coaster collided with the trawler Prince Leo (United Kingdom) in the North Sea off Spurn Head, Yorkshire and sank with the loss of one of her sixteen crew.

=== 6 November ===
List of shipwrecks: 6 November 1927
Ship	State	Description
Emily E. Selid	United Kingdom	The schooner was driven ashore on Groais Island, Newfoundland and was a total loss.

=== 7 November ===
List of shipwrecks: 7 November 1927
Ship	State	Description
Hafenbier	Germany	The cargo ship was shelled and sunk in the Baltic Sea by a Latvian Coast Guard vessel as she was intercepted whilst smuggling alcohol. Her crew were rescued.

=== 8 November ===
List of shipwrecks: 8 November 1927
Ship	State	Description
Catala	United Kingdom	Catala The cargo liner ran aground 40 nautical miles (74 km) north of the mouth of Prince Rupert, British Columbia, Canada. Her passengers were taken off. She was refloated on 6 December.
M. O. Crowell	United Kingdom	The three-masted schooner sprang a leak in the Atlantic Ocean (29°12′N 64°12′W) and was abandoned. Her crew were rescued by Tirtuguero (United Kingdom).

=== 9 November ===
List of shipwrecks: 9 November 1927
Ship	State	Description
Adelaide Day	United States	The schooner was reported abandoned and on fire in the Atlantic Ocean (39°59′N 70°46′W). She was taken in tow on 14 November by the cutter USCGC Manning ( United States Coast Guard) and taken to Norfolk, Virginia, arriving on 16 November.
Mary Lee	United States	Carrying her captain, a passenger, and a cargo of supplies for a mine, the 11-gross register ton motor vessel departed Valdez, Territory of Alaska, bound for Shoup Bay (61°07′15″N 146°35′30″W) but never arrived. She was reported missing on 14 November. A search party later found her stranded on a rock inside the entrance to Shoup Bay and also found the body of her passenger. Her captain′s body was never found. Efforts to refloat her were abandoned when a storm struck, and she disappeared during the storm, presumably sliding off the rock and sinking in deep water.
Sagres	Portugal	The schooner ran aground at Sagres Point and was a total loss.

=== 10 November ===
List of shipwrecks: 10 November 1927
Ship	State	Description
Pepin	Spain	The cargo ship sustained a broke propeller shaft off Cabo Quintres and was abandoned with the loss of two of her crew. She was towed into Santander, Cantabria on 12 November.

=== 12 November ===
List of shipwrecks: 12 November 1927
Ship	State	Description
Jayanti	United Kingdom	The passenger ship departed Bombay on this day for Dapoli, India. Believed foundered in the Arabian Sea off Janjira with the loss of all 51 passengers and 46 crew.

=== 15 November ===
List of shipwrecks: 15 November 1927
Ship	State	Description
Angele Achaque	France	The cargo ship foundered in the Mediterranean Sea off Tipaza, Algeria with the loss of all hands.
Sant Tookaram	United Kingdom	The passenger ship foundered in the Arabian Sea 60 nautical miles (110 km) south of Bombay, India (18°00′N 72°57′E) with the loss of 118 of the 136 people on board.

=== 16 November ===
List of shipwrecks: 16 November 1927
Ship	State	Description
Basse Indre	France	The cargo ship exploded and sank in the Bay of Biscay (approximately 44°N 9°W). Her crew were rescued by Depute Georges Chaigne (France).

=== 17 November ===
List of shipwrecks: 17 November 1927
Ship	State	Description
Don Lorenzo	Venezuela	The coaster capsized and sank in Torbay.

=== 18 November ===
List of shipwrecks: 18 November 1927
Ship	State	Description
Pearson	United States	The cargo ship sank in the Detroit River.
Zaritza	Finland	The three-masted barque foundered in the Gulf of Bothnia with the loss of seven of her fourteen crew.

=== 19 November ===
List of shipwrecks: 19 November 1927
Ship	State	Description
Universe	United States	After being hove to for three days in the lee of Chirikof Island to take shelter from a gale during a voyage there from Kodiak, Territory of Alaska, with a crew of four and a cargo of ten tons of general merchandise on board, the 39-gross register ton, 59.2-foot (18.0 m) fishing vessel finally was blown ashore on Chirikof Island and wrecked without loss of life. The steamer Starr (United States) picked up her crew.

=== 20 November ===
List of shipwrecks: 20 November 1927
Ship	State	Description
Maurita	Norway	The cargo ship ran aground at Barbate, Cádiz, Spain. She was refloated on 9 December.

=== 21 November ===
List of shipwrecks: 21 November 1927
Ship	State	Description
Claymont	United Kingdom	The cargo ship ran aground at Hornillo, Spain. She was refloated on 30 November.
Ditmar Koel	Germany	The cargo liner ran aground on the Amherst Rocks, off the coast of China. She was abandoned on 22 November, and was declared a total loss the next day.
Djerissa	Germany	The cargo ship ran aground on the Cresswell Rocks, off Newbiggin-by-Sea, Northumberland, United Kingdom. Her crew were taken off by rocket apparatus.
Eberfeld	Germany	The cargo liner ran aground at Cape Trafalgar, Spain. All on board were rescued by Rescue (United Kingdom). She was a total loss.
Efos	United Kingdom	The cargo ship was driven ashore at Roker, County Durham. She was refloated on 25 November.
Georgia	Netherlands	The tanker ran aground on Haisborough Sands, off the coast of Norfolk, United Kingdom and broke in two. All 31 crew were rescued by H F Bailey ( Royal National Lifeboat Institution) and Trent (United Kingdom).

=== 22 November ===
List of shipwrecks: 22 November 1927
Ship	State	Description
Ariel	United Kingdom	The schooner was driven ashore at La Scie, Newfoundland and was a total loss.
E. P. Morris	United Kingdom	The schooner was driven ashore at La Scie and was wrecked.
Hubro	Norway	The whaler ran aground in the Oliphant Islands. She was refloated on 30 November.
Huo Feng	China	The cargo ship collided with Mogami Maru (Japan) in the Yangtze downstream of Nanking and sank.
Uku	Estonia	The schooner ran aground at the mouth of the River Tay, Scotland with the loss of one of her ten crew. Survivors were rescued by rocket apparatus.

=== 23 November ===
List of shipwrecks: 23 November 1927
Ship	State	Description
Copenhagen	United Kingdom	The cargo ship ran aground on the Chincorro Bank, Cuba. She was refloated on 1 December.

=== 25 November ===
List of shipwrecks: 25 November 1927
Ship	State	Description
Tenpaisan Maru	Japan	The cargo ship ran aground 12 nautical miles (22 km) north of Grays Harbor, Washington. She broke up the next day and was a total loss.

=== 26 November ===
List of shipwrecks: 26 November 1927
Ship	State	Description
Admiral Drake	Canada	The schooner was wrecked near Scatarie Island, Nova Scotia.
Fearless	United States	The four-masted schooner was driven ashore at Lucretia Point, Cuba and wrecked. Her crew were rescued.
Frances Anne	United States	The cargo ship caught fire at Philadelphia, Pennsylvania and was scuttled. She was refloated on 7 December.

=== 27 November ===
List of shipwrecks: 27 November 1927
Ship	State	Description
Wahehe	Germany	The cargo liner collided with a pier at Boulogne, Pas-de-Calais, France and was beached. She was later refloated, repaired and returned to service.

=== 28 November ===
List of shipwrecks: 28 November 1927
Ship	State	Description
Ellen	United Kingdom	The tug collided with Cadogan Pier, Chelsea, London and sank with the loss of two of her five crew. She was refloated on 29 November.
Governor Marshall	United States	The 60 ton motor vessel was wrecked near Middle Head, Shelburne, Nova Scotia.
Kanazawa Maru	Japan	The cargo ship ran aground in the Kurushima Strait and sank.
Perseus	United Kingdom	The Thames barge collided with Marienburg (Germany) in the River Thames at Rotherhithe, Kent and sank.
Rose Murphy	United States	The cargo ship struck a submerged object in the Atlantic Ocean 12 nautical miles (22 km) off Key West, Florida and sank. Her crew survived.

=== 29 November ===
List of shipwrecks: 29 November 1927
Ship	State	Description
Guardian	United Kingdom	The cargo ship foundered in the English Channel 6 nautical miles (11 km) east south east of the North Goodwin Lightship (United Kingdom). Her crew were rescued by the Ramsgate Lifeboat.
Monte Bianco	Italy	The cargo ship came ashore at Brumhausen, Hamburg, Germany. She was refloated on 3 December.

=== 30 November ===
List of shipwrecks: 30 November 1927
Ship	State	Description
Home	United Kingdom	The schooner was abandoned in the Atlantic Ocean off Harbour Grand, Newfoundland. She came ashore at Freshwater, Conception Bay and was wrecked.
Kathleen W	Canada	The schooner foundered in the Atlantic Ocean off Cape Smoky, 25 miles south of Ingonish, Nova Scotia, Canada.
Lochmonar	United Kingdom	The refrigerated cargo liner ran aground in the Mersey Estuary off the Crosby Lightship (United Kingdom) Her passengers and some of the crew were taken off. She broke her back later that day. The stern section was refloated on 8 December. She was subsequently repaired and returned to service.

== December ==
=== 1 December ===
List of shipwrecks: 1 December 1927
Ship	State	Description
Mary Watkinson	United Kingdom	The schooner was hit by S.N.A. 2 (France) in the English Channel 60 nautical miles (110 km) off The Lizard, Cornwall and sank with the loss of two of her six crew. The survivors were rescued by S.N.A. 2.

=== 2 December ===
List of shipwrecks: 2 December 1927
Ship	State	Description
Governor Marshall	United States	The 81 ton sailing ship was wrecked near Liverpool, Nova Scotia.

=== 3 December ===
List of shipwrecks: 3 December 1927
Ship	State	Description
Dorothy Drover	United Kingdom	The schooner was driven ashore and wrecked on Long Island, Nova Scotia, Canada. Her crew were rescued.
Una	United Kingdom	The schooner was driven ashore and wrecked at Bay de Verde, Labrador.

=== 4 December ===
List of shipwrecks: 4 December 1927
Ship	State	Description
Millville	United States	The 230-foot (70.1 m), 1,213-gross register ton schooner barge sank in a storm in the North Atlantic Ocean 4 miles (6.4 km) off Sea Girt Light off Point Pleasant Beach, New Jersey , without loss of life in 80 feet (24 m) of water. Her tow vessel cut her and other barges, including John H. Winstead, loose and rescued Millville's crew. Her wreck is known as the "String Wreck."

=== 5 December ===
List of shipwrecks: 5 December 1927
Ship	State	Description
Cibao	Norway	The cargo ship was driven ashore at Cape Hatteras, North Carolina, United States and wrecked. All 24 crew were rescued.
John H. Winstead	United States	The 215-foot (65.5 m), 1,160-gross register ton schooner barge sank in a storm in the North Atlantic Ocean 4 miles (6.4 km) Sea Girt Light off Point Pleasant Beach, New Jersey, without loss of life in 80 feet (24 m) of water. Her tow vessel cut her and other barges, including Millville, loose the previous day when Millville started sinking. Her wreck is known as "Cramer's wreck" and erroneously as the "Cadet wreck."
Millville	United States	The 229-foot (69.8 m), 1,213-gross register ton schooner barge sank in a storm in the North Atlantic Ocean 4 miles (6.4 km) Sea Girt Light while under tow.
Paraguay	Greece	The tanker was driven ashore at Cape Hatteras with the loss of four of her 28 crew. Survivors were rescued by breeches buoy.

=== 6 December ===
List of shipwrecks: 6 December 1927
Ship	State	Description
Gloria	United Kingdom	The ketch foundered off Rhosilli, Glamorgan. Her crew survived.

=== 7 December ===
List of shipwrecks: 7 December 1927
Ship	State	Description
Agawa	United Kingdom	The cargo ship ran aground at Michael's Bay, Ontario, Canada.
Altadoc	Canada	The cargo ship suffered a failure of her steering gear in Lake Superior. She drifted ashore at Eagle Harbor, Michigan, United States. Some of her crew were taken off by General (United Kingdom) and a yawl. She broke her back on 9 December, and the rest of her crew were taken off two days later by USCGC Crawford ( United States Coast Guard). Altadoc was declared a total loss.
Kamloops	Canada	Drawing of the wreck of Kamloops, c. 2008 The cargo ship foundered off Twelve O'Clock Point, Isle Royale, in Lake Superior with the loss of all 22 crew. Five survivors made it to Isle Royale but died from the elements. The ship's wreck was located on 25 August 1977 in 195 feet (59 m) of water.
Occident	United Kingdom	The schooner was driven ashore at Point Verde, Newfoundland and was wrecked.

=== 8 December ===
List of shipwrecks: 8 December 1927
Ship	State	Description
Johannes Körner III	Germany	The tug collided with Auk (United Kingdom) at Hamburg and sank.
"Somersby"	United Kingdom	The steam trawler was lost in Mayport Bay, Mull of Galloway.

=== 9 December ===
List of shipwrecks: 9 December 1927
Ship	State	Description
Theodora Palmer	United States	The schooner barge foundered near Brigantine Gas Buoy, New Jersey.
Lady Combe	United Kingdom	The bucket dredger departed from Glasgow, Renfrewshire for Lagos, Nigeria. No further trace, presumed foundered with the loss of all hands.

=== 10 December ===
List of shipwrecks: 10 December 1927
Ship	State	Description
E. W. Oglebay	United States	The cargo ship ran aground at Shot Point, Michigan. She was then gutted by fire but her crew were rescued.

=== 12 December ===
List of shipwrecks: 12 December 1927
Ship	State	Description
Itapura	Brazil	The cargo ship collided with HSwMS Fylgia (Swedish Navy) at Salvador, Bahia and sank. All 40 crew were rescued.
Lambton	United Kingdom	The cargo ship ran aground on the Ile Parisienne, Lake Superior with the loss of two of her 21 crew. She was abandoned by the survivors.
Neponset	United States	The 76-foot (23 m), 87-gross register ton tug sank in 78 feet (24 m) of water in Buzzards Bay off the coast of Massachusetts north of Penikese Island at 41°29.066′N 070°54.969′W after colliding at night with the steamer Robert E. Lee (United States). Her wreck was refloated a few months later and sold at public auction.

=== 13 December ===
List of shipwrecks: 13 December 1927
Ship	State	Description
Seminole	United Kingdom	The tanker ran aground in the River Mersey at Liverpool, Lancashire. She was refloated on 20 December.

=== 14 December ===
List of shipwrecks: 14 December 1927
Ship	State	Description
Agnes	United Kingdom	The Thames barge collided with Imanta (Latvia) in the River Thames at Gravesend, Kent and sank. Her crew were rescued.

=== 15 December ===
List of shipwrecks: 15 December 1927
Ship	State	Description
Neponset	United States	The tug collided with Robert E. Lee (United States) at Boston, Massachusetts and sank.
Oldenburg	Germany	The dredger capsized and sank off Cuxhaven, Germany.
Titania	Norway	The cargo ship ran aground at Gävle, Sweden. She was refloated on 20 December.

=== 16 December ===
List of shipwrecks: 16 December 1927
Ship	State	Description
Asta	Sweden	The cargo ship collided with Breslau (United Kingdom) off the Isle of May, Fife, United Kingdom and sank. Her crew were rescued by Breslau.
Eden Force	United Kingdom	The cargo ship collided with Equity (United Kingdom) at Antwerp, Belgium and was beached. She was later patched and towed to Terneuzen, Netherlands.
Sweet May	United Kingdom	The sailing barge foundered at Porthoustock, Cornwall.

=== 17 December ===
List of shipwrecks: 17 December 1927
Ship	State	Description
USS S-4	United States Navy	The S-class submarine was rammed accidentally by the cutter USCGC Paulding ( United States Coast Guard) and sank in 100 feet (30 m) of water 0.75 nautical miles (1.4 km; 0.9 mi) off Wood End Light, Provincetown, Massachusetts, with the loss of all 40 members of her crew. She was raised in March 1928, repaired, and returned to service.

=== 19 December ===
List of shipwrecks: 19 December 1927
Ship	State	Description
Pioneer	United States	Carrying a cargo of 27 tons of gasoline and a crew of two, the 37-gross register ton, 60.8-foot (18.5 m) motor vessel departed Katalla, Territory of Alaska, bound for Cordova, Territory of Alaska. Sometime soon thereafter, she was wrecked during a gale and snowstorm on Strawberry Bar (60°24′N 146°03′W), a shoal off Hinchinbrook Island at the entrance to Prince William Sound on the coast of Southcentral Alaska. Both crew members perished.

=== 20 December ===
List of shipwrecks: 20 December 1927
Ship	State	Description
Doris Crane	United Kingdom	The three-masted schooner caught fire on 19 December when fuel for her auxiliary diesel engine was spilt. Her engineer was burned and later died. The crew fought to contain the fire but it spread, and after 18 hours they abandoned ship on 20 December about 350 nautical miles (650 km) north of Hawaii. Doris Crane had no wireless, but RMS Niagara saw smoke from the fire and rescued 14 survivors.
Pearl	United Kingdom	The schooner was driven ashore at Garrettstown, County Cork, Ireland and was wrecked with the loss of all five crew.
Penelope	(Kingdom of Iraq) Iraq	The tanker ran aground at Istanbul, Turkey. She was refloated on 29 December.
Treloske	United Kingdom	The cargo ship ran aground in the Paraná River, Argentina. She was refloated on 29 December.

=== 21 December ===
List of shipwrecks: 21 December 1927
Ship	State	Description
Ena A. Moulton	United Kingdom	The schooner was abandoned in the Atlantic Ocean (38°34′N 55°21′W). Her crew survived.
Hatchmere	United Kingdom	The cargo ship foundered off Islandmagee, County Antrim.
Trio	United States	The 28-gross register ton, 46.4-foot (14.1 m) fishing vessel caught fire while at anchor in Kachemak Bay on the coast of the Territory of Alaska. She was towed ashore and beached, but the fire burned out of control and destroyed her. Both members of her crew survived.

=== 22 December ===
List of shipwrecks: 22 December 1927
Ship	State	Description
Alexandra	United Kingdom	The cargo ship was destroyed by fire at Toronto, Ontario, Canada.
Edde Theriault	United Kingdom	The schooner foundered at Demerara, British Guiana.
Oscar	Sweden	The cargo ship caught fire in the North Sea. She was beached at Corton, Suffolk, United Kingdom. She was declared a constructive total loss, subsequently sinking on 24 December at 52°32′N 1°37′E.

=== 23 December ===
List of shipwrecks: 23 December 1927
Ship	State	Description
Gougou	France	The schooner lost her mast 300 m from the Sevenstones Lightship (United Kingdom), between Cornwall and the Isles of Scilly. The crew of seven men was taken off by the St Mary's lifeboat and the Gougou was picked up the next day by Trinity vessel SS Mermaid (United Kingdom) and towed to Penzance.
Hild	Sweden	The cargo ship collided with Arantzazu Mendi (Spain) in the Scheldt at Austruweel, Belgium and was beached.
Pyrope	United Kingdom	The cargo ship ran aground at Kettleness Point, Yorkshire. Her crew were rescued by the Runswick Lifeboat.
Sylva Gouvei	Portugal	The cargo ship was driven ashore near Cape Torinana, Spain and was abandoned by her crew.

=== 24 December ===
List of shipwrecks: 24 December 1927
Ship	State	Description
Gougou	France	The schooner was dismasted and abandoned off the Isles of Scilly, United Kingdom. All seven crew were rescued by the Scilly Lifeboat.

=== 25 December ===
List of shipwrecks: 25 December 1927
Ship	State	Description
Clan Macwilliam	United Kingdom	The cargo ship was destroyed by fire and sank at Vavaʻu, Tonga.

=== 26 December ===
List of shipwrecks: 26 December 1927
Ship	State	Description
David M	United Kingdom	The coaster was driven ashore at Birchington, Kent and was abandoned by her four crew.

=== 27 December ===
List of shipwrecks: 27 December 1927
Ship	State	Description
Colytto	Netherlands	The cargo ship ran aground at Rosario, Brazil. She was refloated on 1 January 1928.
Fred Everard	United Kingdom	The Thames barge was driven ashore at Whitstable, Kent. She was refloated on 3 January 1928.
Hafsten	Sweden	The cargo ship was driven ashore at Cuxhaven, Germany. Her crew were rescued. She was refloated on 30 December.
Lady Daphne	United Kingdom	The Thames barge was abandoned in the Atlantic Ocean off the Isles of Scilly and was a total loss. Her crew were rescued by the Lizard Lifeboat.
Seviedj	Turkey	The coaster collided with Marmara (Turkey) in the Sea of Marmara off Boz Burun and sank with the loss of 26 lives.

=== 28 December ===
List of shipwrecks: 28 December 1927
Ship	State	Description
Dainichizan Maru	Japan	The cargo ship was driven ashore and wrecked near Otaru, Hokkaidō with the loss of all hands.

=== 29 December ===
List of shipwrecks: 29 December 1927
Ship	State	Description
Carpio	United Kingdom	The cargo ship ran aground at Seville, Andalusia, Spain. She was refloated on 2 January 1928.
Drift	United Kingdom	The unmanned pilot cutter was sunk by the schooner Amy (United Kingdom) swinging at anchor in Portland Harbour, England, in a gale.
Myogisan Maru	Japan	The cargo ship was driven ashore at Oshima, Hokkaidō and was wrecked.
Toyo Maru	Japan	The cargo ship was driven ashore on the west coast of Tsushima Island and was wrecked with the loss of two crew.

=== 30 December ===
List of shipwrecks: 30 December 1927
Ship	State	Description
Clitunno	Italy	The cargo ship was wrecked in the Black Sea between Cape Shableh and Cape Kaliakra.
Ebor	United Kingdom	The 104.2-foot (31.8 m), 165-ton steam trawler sank following an explosion in her engine room 6.5 miles (10.5 km) east southeast from May Island in the Firth of Forth. The crew got off in her boat and was rescued by Glenogil (United Kingdom).
USS Rush	United States Navy	The patrol boat collided with J. A. Moffett (United States) in the Ambrose Channel and sank. Her crew were rescued by J. A. Moffett.
Seneca	United States	The cargo ship, passenger ship, or tugboat (Depending on source) was severely damaged by fire at Hoboken, New Jersey and sank. She was a constructive total loss. Refloated on 2 September 1928 and scrapped in February 1929.

=== 31 December ===
List of shipwrecks: 31 December 1927
Ship	State	Description
Consul Horn	Germany	The cargo ship ran aground on Ven, Sweden. She was refloated on 4 January 1928.
Jinju Maru	Japan	The cargo ship ran aground on the Idzu Peninsula and sank with the loss of all hands.
Kashima Maru	Japan	The cargo liner collided with St. Elma (United Kingdom) in the River Thames at Barking, Essex and was beached. She was refloated later that day.
Meta	Finland	The cargo ship ran aground at Cornaig, Argyllshire and was abandoned by her crew. She was later reboarded and refloated.
Norfolk	United States	The cargo ship collided with Lake Inglenook (United States) at Boston, Massachusetts and was beached.

== Unknown date ==
List of shipwrecks: Unknown date in 1927
Ship	State	Description
America	United States	The passenger and package delivery steamer rammed a pier and ran aground while entering a port on the Great Lakes. She was repaired and returned to service.
Edna M. McKnight	United States	The 209-foot (64 m), 1,326-gross register ton four-masted schooner was abandoned in Mill Cove at Boothbay Harbor, Maine, and became a wreck at 43°51′07″N 069°38′06″W.
Henry Cort	United States	The whaleback steamer was stranded on Colchester Reef in Lake Erie sometime in 1927. She was abandoned by her owners to the insurance company and sold. Later raised.
Mafeking	United Kingdom	The ship sank in Loch Torridon during the attempt to salvage Sheila (United Kingdom).
Pelican	Canada	The barge sank at Sydney, Nova Scotia after her sea cocks were opened by vandals.
Sligo	Canada	1927 Nova Scotia hurricane: The fishing schooner sank in a Hurricane near Halifax, Nova Scotia in 1927, probably the 1927 Nova Scotia hurricane. Lost with two hands.
