= Orlando Fernández (swimmer) =

Puerto Rican long-distance swimmer (born 1971)

Personal information
- Full name: Orlando Fernández De La Crúz
- Nickname: Puerto Rican Aquaman
- Nationality: Puerto Rico
- Born: 1971 (age 54–55) Santurce, San Juan, Puerto Rico

Sport
- Sport: Swimming

Orlando Fernández De La Crúz, a.k.a. "Aquaman Boricua" (born 1971), is a long-distance swimmer and the first Puerto Rican swimmer to cross the Strait of Gibraltar.

== Early life and education ==
Orlando Fernández De La Crúz was born in Santurce, San Juan, Puerto Rico. There he received his primary and secondary education. Fernández learned to swim when he was four years old at the swimming pools of el Escambrón and Sheraton hotels in San Juan. He learned to surf by the age of ten. In 1996, he earned a bachelor's degree in marketing from the Universidad Metropolitana.

== Career ==
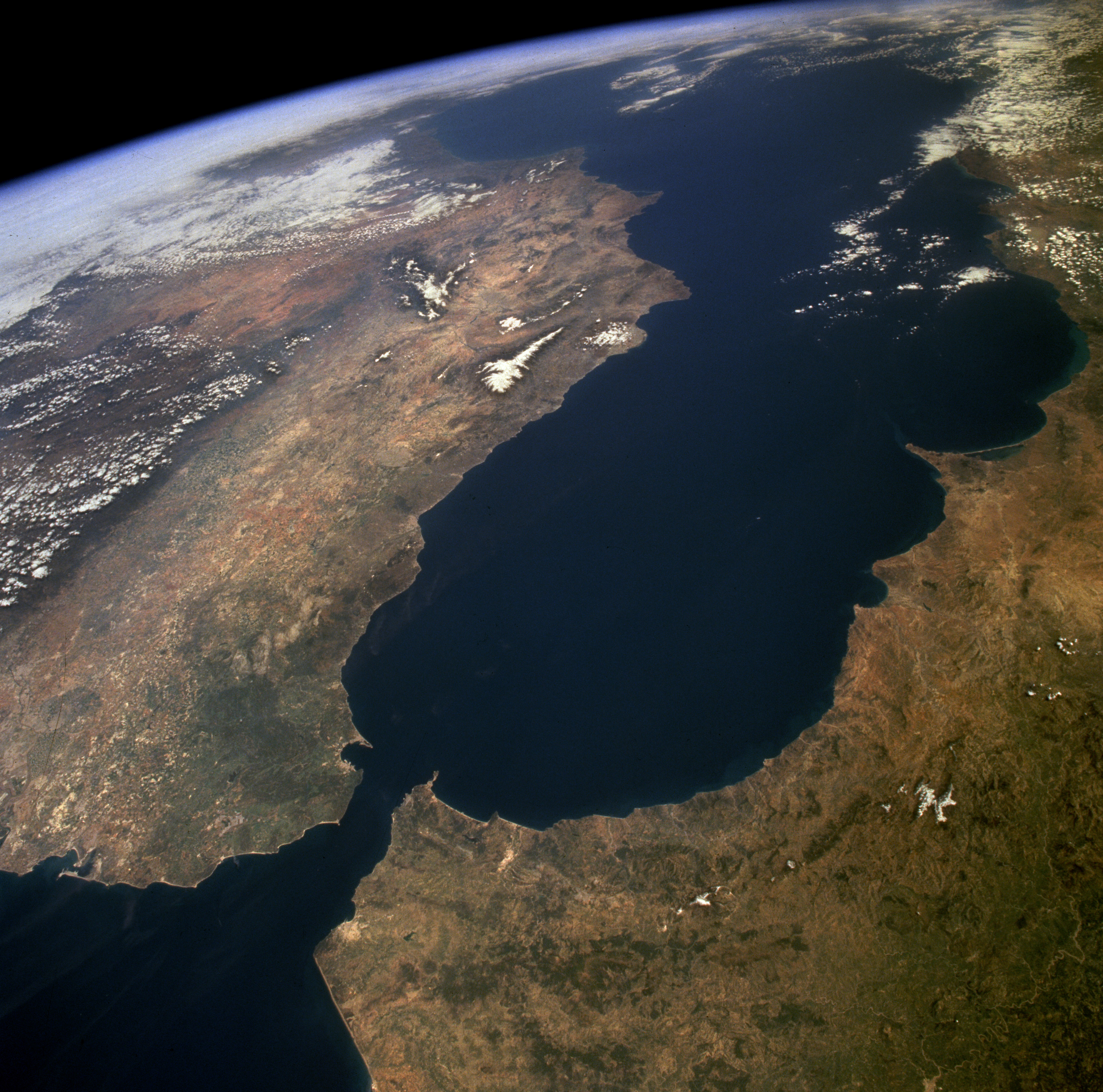
The Strait of Gibraltar as seen from space. (North is to the left: The Iberian Peninsula is on the left and North Africa on the right).

Fernández holds various records in long-distance swimming, among them the long swimming records of 20 kilometers at Key West, Florida, and 25 kilometers in Indiana.

Fernández was inspired and motivated to represent his country in international swimming events by his long-distance swimming coach Marcos Díaz, a native of the Dominican Republic. When he decided to attempt the crossing of the Strait of Gibraltar, he requested and received the help and training of Pedro Díaz. Díaz coached Fernández on the physical training required before and after the crossing of the strait.

In 2008, Fernández swam 12 hours straight during his participation in "100 x 35", a TV program directed by Julián Gil.

On May 19, 2011, Fernández departed from Cadiz, Spain, and swam the Strait for three hours and 57 minutes covering a distance of 18 kilometers in 65 °F waters. He reached Point Cires, Morocco, accomplishing his lifelong dream and becoming the first Puerto Rican ever to do so.

Among other sports he practices are kayaking (of which he also an instructor), spinning, paddleboarding and surfing. He also serves as a motivational speaker at public schools and private enterprises. Fernandez plans on swimming from Vieques to Palmas del Mar in Humacao, in a benefit drive to help the Children with Cancer Foundation.

== Recognition ==
On September 4, 2011, the Cruce a Nado Internacional de la Bahía de Ponce, an international swimming competition, was dedicated to Fernández in recognition of his accomplishments. The dedication took place at the Parque Enrique González (also known as the Malecón) in Playa de Ponce.

== Personal life ==
Fernández currently resides in Hato Rey, San Juan, Puerto Rico.

== See also ==
- List of Puerto Ricans
- Sports in Puerto Rico
