= Cireșeni =

Cireșeni may refer to several places in Romania:

- Cireșeni, a village in Feliceni Commune, Harghita County
- Cireșeni, a village in Cotnari Commune, Iași County
- Cireșeni, a tributary of the Târnava Mare in Harghita County

== See also ==
- Cireșu (disambiguation)
