= Cireșoaia =

Cireşoaia may refer to several villages in Romania:

- Cireşoaia, a village in the town of Slănic-Moldova, Bacău County
- Cireşoaia, Bistriţa-Năsăud, a village in Braniștea, Bistrița-Năsăud

== See also ==
- Cireșu (disambiguation)
