= Valea Cireșului =

Valea Cireșului may refer to the following places in Romania:

- Valea Cireșului, a village in the commune Botoroaga, Teleorman County
- Valea Cireșului, a tributary of the Lozna in Caraș-Severin County
- Valea Cireșului, another name for a section of the Gepiu in Bihor County

== See also ==
- Cireș (disambiguation)
- Cireșu (disambiguation)
