= Cruce a Nado Internacional =

Yearly international swimming competition that takes place at Bahía de Ponce

Coordinates: 17°58′43.5″N 66°37′9.2″W

- Current season, competition or edition: 2021
- Isla Cardona from where athletes must swim to the Ponce shore
- Formerly: Cruce a Nado Internacional de la Bahia de Ponce, Puerto Rico
- Sport: Swimming
- Founded: 1980
- Founder: Efrén Coímbre de Jesús
- First season: September 1980
- Owners: Club Cruce a Nado, Inc.
- Director: Héctor Pérez Torres
- President: Jose Santiago (2018 - incumbent); Dr. Francisco Alcala Carrera (2011? - 2018)
- No. of teams: Over 100 athletes
- Country: Argentina Bolivia; Colombia; Costa Rica; Dominican Republic; Ecuador; El Salvador; Guatemala; Honduras; Mexico; Nicaragua; Panama; Puerto Rico; United States; Venezuela United States Virgin Islands
- Venues: Parque Enrique González, El Malecón, Playa, Ponce, Puerto Rico
- Most recent champion: Venezuela
- Broadcaster: WPAB
- Sponsor: Municipality of Ponce
- Level on pyramid: Men's, Women's, Over 56+
- Domestic cup: Copa Héctor Pérez

Notes
- Host Country: Ponce, Puerto Rico

Cruce a Nado Internacional is a yearly international swimming competition that takes place at Bahía de Ponce in Ponce, Puerto Rico. It is the oldest open water swimming event in the Caribbean. The event generally occurs on the first Sunday of September, to coincide with the Sunday of Labor Day Weekend every year. The event is sponsored by Club Cruce a Nado, Inc. Some 100 athletes compete, swimming 1.5 nautical miles (2.8 km; 1.7 mi) nautical miles. The event started in 1980. The 2020 season's event did not take place due to the COVID-19 pandemic, but its 40th season took place on 5 September 2021 instead.

== History ==
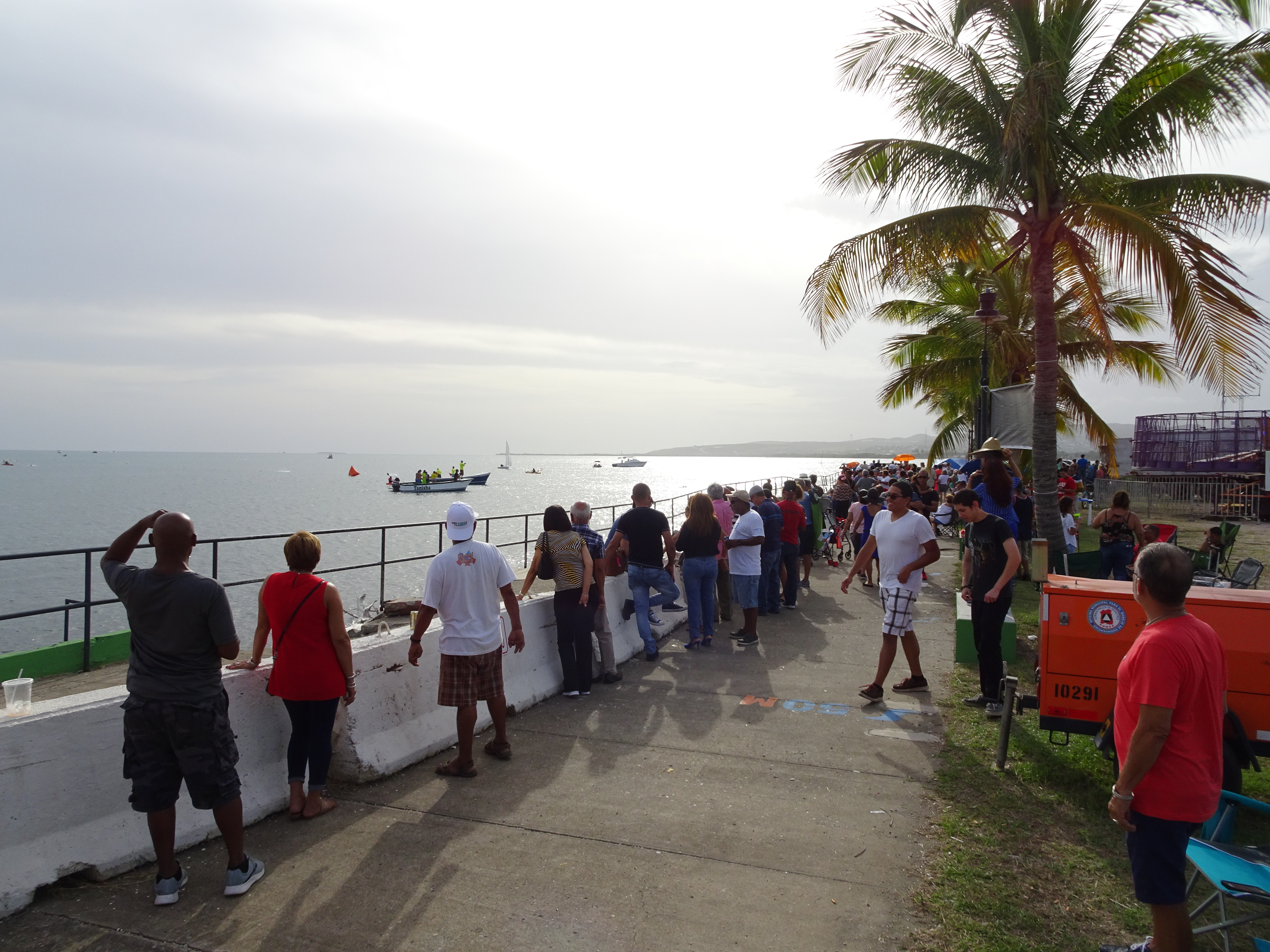
A crowd attends the 39th Cruce a Nado Internacional at Bahía de Ponce, Barrio Playa, Ponce, Puerto Rico

The competition started in 1980 under the sponsorship of the Ponce Municipal Government. It has gained popularity every year with a greater number of athletes participating from an equally greater number of countries. In 2008, 16 countries were represented. The competition abides by the rules of the Federación Internacional de Natación (FINA) (International Swimming Federation) and the approval of the Federación Puertorriqueña de Natación (FPN) (Puerto Rican Swimming Federation). Countries that have competed in the past include Bolivia, Colombia, Costa Rica, Dominican Republic, Ecuador, El Salvador, Guatemala, Honduras, Nicaragua, Panama, Puerto Rico, United States, U.S. Virgin Islands and Venezuela. The competition originally included local Puerto Rican swimmers only, but after two years, it was opened to foreign nationals as well.

It is a common practice to dedicate the event to athletes who have made outstanding accomplishments in the sport. On 4 September 2011, the 30th annual competition was dedicated to Orlando Fernández, a.k.a. "The Puerto Rican Aquaman", the first Puerto Rican to swim across the Strait of Gibraltar, in recognition of his accomplishments.

== Venue ==
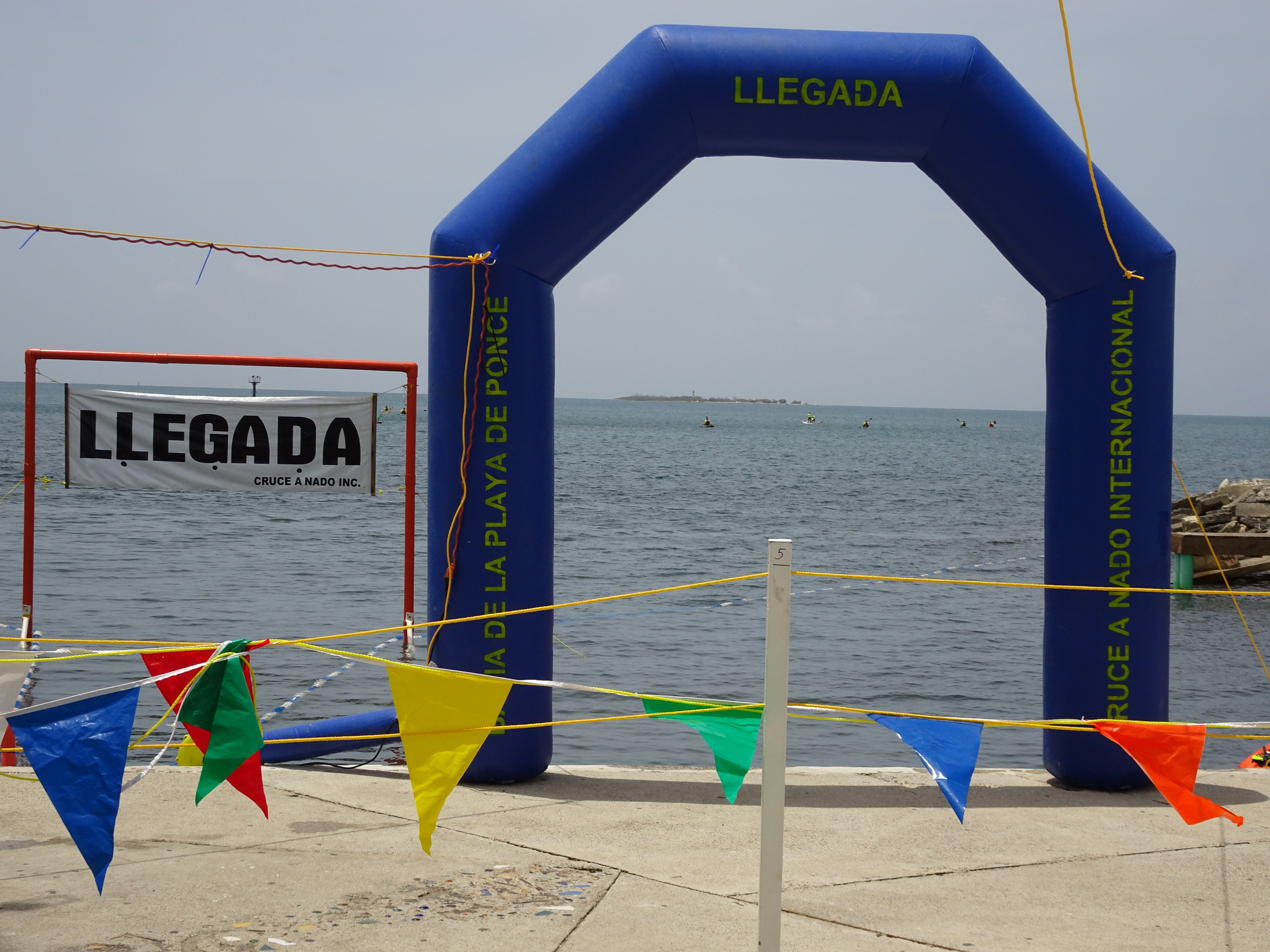
Finish line and portal at the competition. Isla Cardona, from where swimmers depart, is in the far background, between the two blue pillars of the portal

The competition consists of crossing the Bay of Ponce from Cardona Island, which is situated about 1.5 nautical miles from mainland's Puerto Rico southern shores in Ponce, to the southern shore of Puerto Rico at Ponce. The entire event starts on the Thursday before the Sunday of the competitions with music, shows and traditional foods. The Ponce Municipal Government contributes $20,000 to the costs of celebrating the event.

== Procedure ==
Athletes are taken by boat to Isla Cardona which is located just 1.5 nautical miles from the mainland. At the sound of the whistle, athletes then swim the 2,800 meters - 1.5 nautical miles - across the bay towards sector El Malecón in Playa de Ponce. Athletes arrive at Parque Enrique González in Playa de Ponce, which is located across from the U.S. Customs House and has an area with steps that lead down to the bay waters. The first athlete to arrive is the winner. First place, second place, and third place awards are given. The Mayor of Ponce awaits athletes at El Malecon's finish line to bestow medals, prizes and other awards on the winners.

Beyond the two main competitive divisions based on gender (Men's and Women's), the 2009 event consisted of two categories: "Categoria Abierta", open to those between ages 13 and 25; and "Categoria Masters", open to those over 26 years of age. The 2011 edition also had the "Over 56+" category for those 56 years old and older.

== Winners ==
As an added bonus and incentive to the first Puerto Rican who makes it to the finish line, in 2008 the municipality added the "Copa Héctor Pérez" (Spanish for Héctor Pérez Cup), which is given to the athlete with those qualities and merit. In 2008, it went to Nathaniel Ramos. Héctor Pérez Torres, born in Playa de Ponce, is a sportsman and community leader, and has been organizing the Cruce a Nado Internacional event.

=== 2005 (25th Competition) ===
As reported by Panama's La Prensa, here is the list of winners.

==== Men's Division ====
Pos.	Name	Country	Time
1	Manuel Chiu Pérez	Mexico	1:02.02
2	Rolando Salas	Venezuela	1:02.15
3	John Kerry	United States	1:02.27

=== 2009 (29th Competition) ===
As reported by the La Regata: el Periodico Nautico de Puerto Rico newsweekly, here is the list of winners.

==== Men's Division ====
Pos.	Name	Country	Time
1	Christian Bayo	Puerto Rico	37.06.00
2	Miguel A. Davila	Colombia	37.06.10
3	Víctor Manuel Muñoz	Dominican Republic	39.09.10

==== Women's Division ====
Pos.	Name	Country	Time
1	Maria G. Muñoz	Guatemala	42.34.12
2	Zuliemarie Hornedo	Puerto Rico	42.34.45
3	Betsmara Cruz	Puerto Rico	43.27.10

==== 56+ Division ====
Pos.	Name	Country	Time
1	Giampiero Rosati	Unknown	01:26.10.00

=== 2010 (30th Competition) ===
Here are the 2010 Men's and Women's winners:

==== Men's Division ====
Pos.	Name	Country	Time
1	Marcos Lavado	Venezuela	35.37
2	Álvaro Lozano	Venezuela	35:48
3	José Sánchez	Ecuador	38.21

==== Women's Division ====
Pos.	Name	Country	Time
1	Karla Díaz	Venezuela	38:43
2	Florencia Melo	Venezuela	38:44
3	Cartha Rodríguez	Puerto Rico	41.27

=== 2011 (31st Competition) ===
As reported by "El Sur a la Vista", here are the 2011 winners in each of the three divisions.

==== Men's Division ====
Pos.	Name	Country	Time
1	Marcos Lavado	Venezuela	34:08
2	Alvaro Lozano	Venezuela	34:11
3	Nathaniel Ramos	Puerto Rico	34:21

==== Women's Division ====
Pos.	Name	Country	Time
1	Carla Díaz	Venezuela	37:40
2	Florencia Melo	Venezuela	37:40
3	María Gabriela Muñoz	Guatemala	37:45
4	Betsmara Cruz	Puerto Rico	38:23

==== 56+ Division ====
Pos.	Name	Country	Time
1	Eduardo Mayol	Unknown	48:46

=== 2012 (32nd Competition) ===
As reported by "La Perla del Sur", here are the 2012 winners.

==== Men's Division ====
Pos.	Name	Country	Time
1	Marcos Lavado	Venezuela	33:19.07
2	Alvaro Lozano	Venezuela	33:21.20
3	Not Available	N/A	N/A

=== 2013 (33rd Competition) ===
As reported by La Perla del Sur newsweekly, here is the list of winners.

==== Men's Division ====
Pos.	Name	Country	Time
1	Iván Enderica	Ecuador	35.30
2	Alvaro Lozano	Venezuela	36:27
3	Isaías Vázquez Tavera	Colombia	36:29

==== Women's Division ====
Pos.	Name	Country	Time
1	Cindy C. Toscano	Guatemala	41:36
2	Paula Montoy	Colombia	41:53
3	Eliana Disla Pascual	República Dominicana	41:52

==== Puerto Rican Men's Swimmers awards ====
Pos.	Name	Country	Time
1	Víctor D. Gaud	Puerto Rico	36:38
2	Jean Carlos Pantojas	Puerto Rico	37:28
3	Calvin Ayala Velázquez	Puerto Rico	37:37
4	Ricardo Miranda	Puerto Rico	37:49

==== Puerto Rican Women's Swimmers awards ====
Pos.	Name	Country	Time
1	Gabriela M. Oquendo	Puerto Rico	43:13

=== 2014 (34th Competition) ===
As reported by La Perla del Sur newsweekly, here is the list of winners.

==== Men's Division ====
Pos.	Name	Country	Time
1	Isaias Vazquez	Colombia	37:36.04
2	Miguel Portes	Dominican Republic	37:36.05
3	Nathaniel Ramos	Puerto Rico	39:20.09
4	Walter Caballero	Bolivia	40:09.83

==== Women's Division ====
Pos.	Name	Country	Time
1	Eliana Disla Pascual	Dominican Republic	43:12.25
2	Zuleimarie Hornedo	Puerto Rico	44:22.43
3	Laura Figueroa	Puerto Rico	46:00.79
4	Paula Montoya	Colombia	46:31.16

==== Puerto Rican Men's Swimmers awards ====
Pos.	Name	Country	Time
1	Nathaniel Ramos	Puerto Rico	39:20.09
2	Victor Gaud	Puerto Rico	40:14.60
3	Calvin Ayala	Puerto Rico	40:19.87

==== Puerto Rican Women's Swimmers awards ====
Pos.	Name	Country	Time
1	Zuleimarie Hornedo	Puerto Rico	44:22.43
2	Laura Figueroa	Puerto Rico	46:00.79
3	Maria Victoria Burgos	Puerto Rico	47:32.38

=== 2015 (35th Competition) ===
As reported by DeportivAPP and Agenda56 here is the list of winners.

==== Men's Division ====
Pos.	Name	Country	Time
1	Miguel Portes	Dominican Republic	35:20.60
1	Isaías Taveras	Colombia	unknown

=== 2016 (36th Competition) ===
As reported by DeportivAPP, here is the list of winners.

==== Men's Division ====
Pos.	Name	Country	Time
1	Miguel Portes	Dominican Republic	39:22

=== 2017 (37th Competition) ===
As reported by 1968: Noticias de Natación de Venezuela y el Mundo, here is the list of winners.

==== Men's Division ====
Pos.	Name	Country	Time
1	Jesus Roso	Venezuela	34:31
2	Edgar Aguiar	Venezuela	unk
3	Jowie Gadea	Puerto Rico	unk

==== Women's Division ====
Pos.	Name	Country	Time
1	Karelis Clemant Materano	Venezuela	39:17
2	Fátima Flores	El Salvador	unk
3	Cindy Toscano	Guatemala	unk

=== 2018 (38th Competition) ===
The 38th Competition was scheduled for 2 September 2018.

=== 2019 (39th Competition) ===
The event took place on 1 September 2019 (see article photos).

=== 2020 ===
The 2020 competition did not take place due to the COVID-19 pandemic.

=== 2021 (40th Competition) ===
The 40th Competition was scheduled to take place on 5 September 2021.

=== 2022 (41st Competition) ===
The 41st edition, scheduled for 4 September 2022, but was halted due to inclement weather. Swimmers at the starting point on Isla Cardona were rescued and brought back to the Ponce mainland due to safety concerns.

=== 2023 (42nd Competition) ===
The 42th edition was scheduled for 3 September 2023, with over 90 swimmers representing eight countries.

=== 2024 (43rd Competition) ===
This event was scheduled for 1 September 2024. Another swimming event also took place during the same weekend named El Panamericano de Aguas Abiertas de PanAm Aquatics. The event was co-ordinted with the Cruce a Nado event personnel, and was open to children as young as 12 years old. Twenty-two swimmers representing five countries took part in this additional Panamericano event.

=== 2025 (44th Competition) ===
The 44th Competition took place in September, 2025.

== See also ==
- Las Justas
- Ponce Grand Prix de Atletismo
- Ponce Marathon
- Ponce Grand Prix
- Carnaval de Ponce
- Feria de Artesanías de Ponce
- Ponce Jazz Festival
- Fiesta Nacional de la Danza
- Día Mundial de Ponce
- Festival Nacional de la Quenepa
- Bienal de Arte de Ponce
