= SS Shahzada =

SS Shahzada may refer to:

- SS Shahzada, a British cargo ship, sunk in the Bay of Bengal on 14 July 1927
- SS Shahzada, a British freighter, sunk on 9 July 1944 by the German submarine U-196, had assisted in picking up survivors of SS Samouri on 26 January 1944
