= Cireș =

Cireș may refer to:

- Cireș, the Romanian name for Cheresh, a commune in Chernivtsi Oblast, Ukraine
- rivers in Romania:
  - Cireș, a tributary of the Almaș in Hunedoara County
  - Cireș (Bâsca), a tributary of the Bâsca in Covasna County
  - Cireș (Coțatcu), a tributary of the Coțatcu in Buzău County
- Patricia Cireș, a Romanian rower

== See also ==
- Cireșu (disambiguation)
- Valea Cireșului (disambiguation)
