= MV Seminole =

History

United Kingdom
- Name: Seminole
- Namesake: Seminole
- Owner: Anglo-American Oil Co Ltd
- Operator: J Hamilton
- Port of registry: Barrow
- Builder: Vickers, Barrow
- Launched: 11 December 1920
- Completed: May 1921
- Identification: UK official number 125910; code letters KJBL
- Fate: ran aground & scrapped

General characteristics
- Tonnage: 6,933 GRT; tonnage under deck 6,194; 4,881 NRT; 10,500 DWT
- Length: 424.5 ft (129.4 m)
- Beam: 57.0 ft (17.4 m)
- Draught: 26 ft 4 in (8.0 m)
- Depth: 33.2 ft (10.1 m)
- Installed power: 698 NHP
- Propulsion: Diesel engines, twin screw
- Notes: sister ship: Narragansett

MV Seminole was a UK motor tanker. She was built in 1921 and ran aground in the River Mersey in 1927, causing an emergency in Liverpool when part of her cargo of petrol escaped into the river. She was scrapped in 1936.

== Building ==
Vickers Limited built Seminole in Barrow-in-Furness for the Anglo-American Oil Co Ltd, completing her in May 1921. She was 424.5 ft (129.4 m) long, had a beam of 57.0 ft (17.4 m) and draught of 26 ft 4 in (8.0 m). She was assessed as 6,933 GRT and 4,881 NRT. She had twin four-stroke diesel engines which between them developed 698 NHP and drove her twin screws.

Seminole was the sister ship to MV Narragansett, which Vickers had completed in May 1920.

== Grounding ==
On 13 December 1927 Seminole was heading up the Mersey laden with 10,000 tons of petrol to be discharged at the oil jetty at Dingle, Liverpool when she ran aground on Pluckington Bank near Brunswick Dock. At low tide some of the steel plates of her hull parted and at least 2,000 tons of her cargo escaped into the river, creating a risk of explosion and fire.

For several days the Port of Liverpool and River Mersey were in a state of emergency. Liverpool City Police sent all available officers to the landing stage to stop people from smoking. Notices were put on Mersey ferries warning people not to strike matches. In case of possible fire, Liverpool Fire Brigade laid out thousands of yards of hose and fire extinguishers were placed in readiness along seven miles of quays in the port.

Anchor Line's 16,792 GRT liner California was at a nearby landing stage with 1,200 troops aboard her. She was moved out of the danger area.

A 6-inch (150 mm) pipe was connected from Seminole to a tanker in Brunswick Dock. What cargo remained in the damaged tanker was transferred to the other vessel.

== Fate ==
In March 1936 Seminole was sold for scrap.
