= Cireșu =

Cireșu may refer to several places in Romania:

- Cireșu, Brăila, a commune in Brăila County
- Cireșu, Mehedinți, a commune in Mehedinți County
- Cireșu, a village in Căteasca Commune, Argeș County
- Cireșu, a village in Mânzălești Commune, Buzău County
- Cireșu and Cireșu Mic, villages in Criciova Commune, Timiș County
- Cireșu, a village in Stroești Commune, Vâlcea County
- Cireșu, a tributary of the Latorița in Vâlcea County
- Cireșu, a tributary of the Putna in Vrancea County

== See also ==
- Cireș (disambiguation)
- Valea Cireșului (disambiguation)
