= Point Cires =

Islands in Morocco

Native name: Arabic: بونتا سيريس

Geography
- Coordinates: 35°54′37″N 5°28′54″W
- Adjacent to: Strait of Gibraltar
- Total islands: 2

Administration
- Morocco

Demographics
- Population: 0

Point Cires (Arabic: بونتا سيريس) is a promontory and two islands off the northern coast of Morocco within the Strait of Gibraltar. The islands have a lighthouse and they are about 100 metres (330 ft) from the mainland offering good anchorage. It is near the Mediterranean port of Tanger-Med within the Tanger-Tetouan-Al Hoceima region of northern Morocco.

This is the part of the European Union which is close to the African coast. Punta de Tarifa in Spain is just thirteen km from Point Cires in Morocco, this is the closest point between the European Union and Africa, making it a target for migrants and smugglers.

Perejil Island, a disputed territory between Morocco and Spain, is about 6 kilometres (3.7 mi) East.

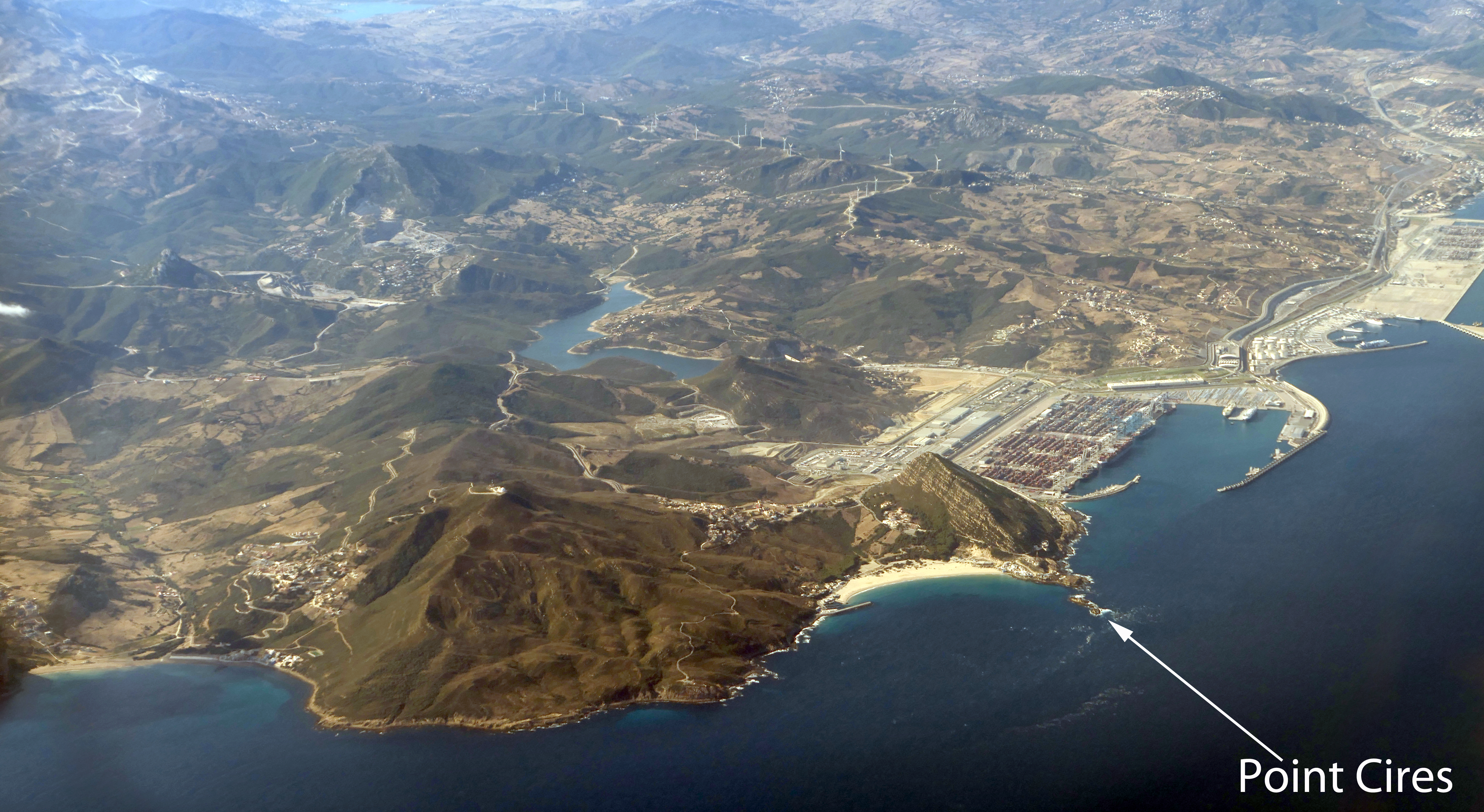
The Moroccan coast near Point Cires.
