= Rubén Colón Tarrats =

Puerto Rican composer from Ponce, Puerto Rico

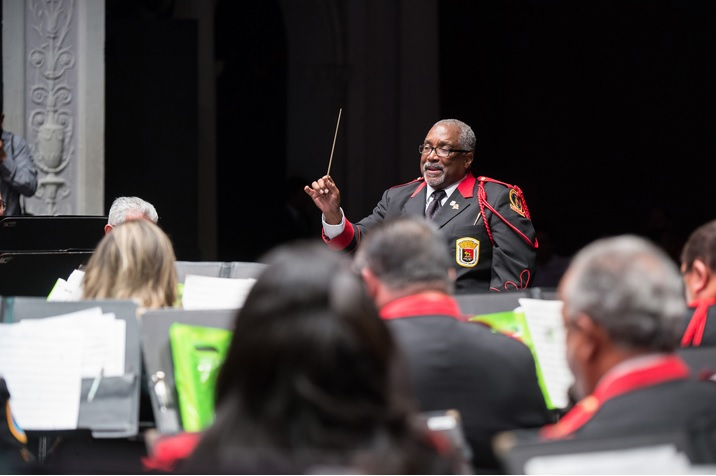
- Rubén Colón Tarrats directing the Banda Municipal de Ponce

Background information
- Born: Rubén Colón; 9 March 1940 (age 86); New York, New York
- Origin: Ponce, Puerto Rico
- Genres: Danzas, plenas, valls, polkas, boleros and danzones
- Occupations: Clarinetist, composer, band director
- Years active: 1965-2013

Rubén Colón Tarrats (b. 1940) is a Puerto Rican composer, clarinet player and band director from Ponce, Puerto Rico. He also conducted the Banda Municipal de Ponce for ten years. He received his music training at Escuela Libre de Música de Ponce, Universidad Interamericana de Puerto Rico, and Temple University College of Music, and was a music professor at Ponce High School, Instituto de Musica Juan Morel Campos, and Pontificia Universidad Catolica de Puerto Rico.

During a music career that spanned half a century, he directed over a dozen choirs, composed over 200 works of music, founded music institutes and music festivals, directed numerous orchestras, presented concerts spanning the Western Hemisphere, and was president of the Puerto Rican Association of Choir Directors. Upon his retirement from active music life, he was honored by many artists, educators, and politicians, and was also honored by the Instituto de Cultura Puertorriqueña and the Ponce Municipal Government.

== Early years ==
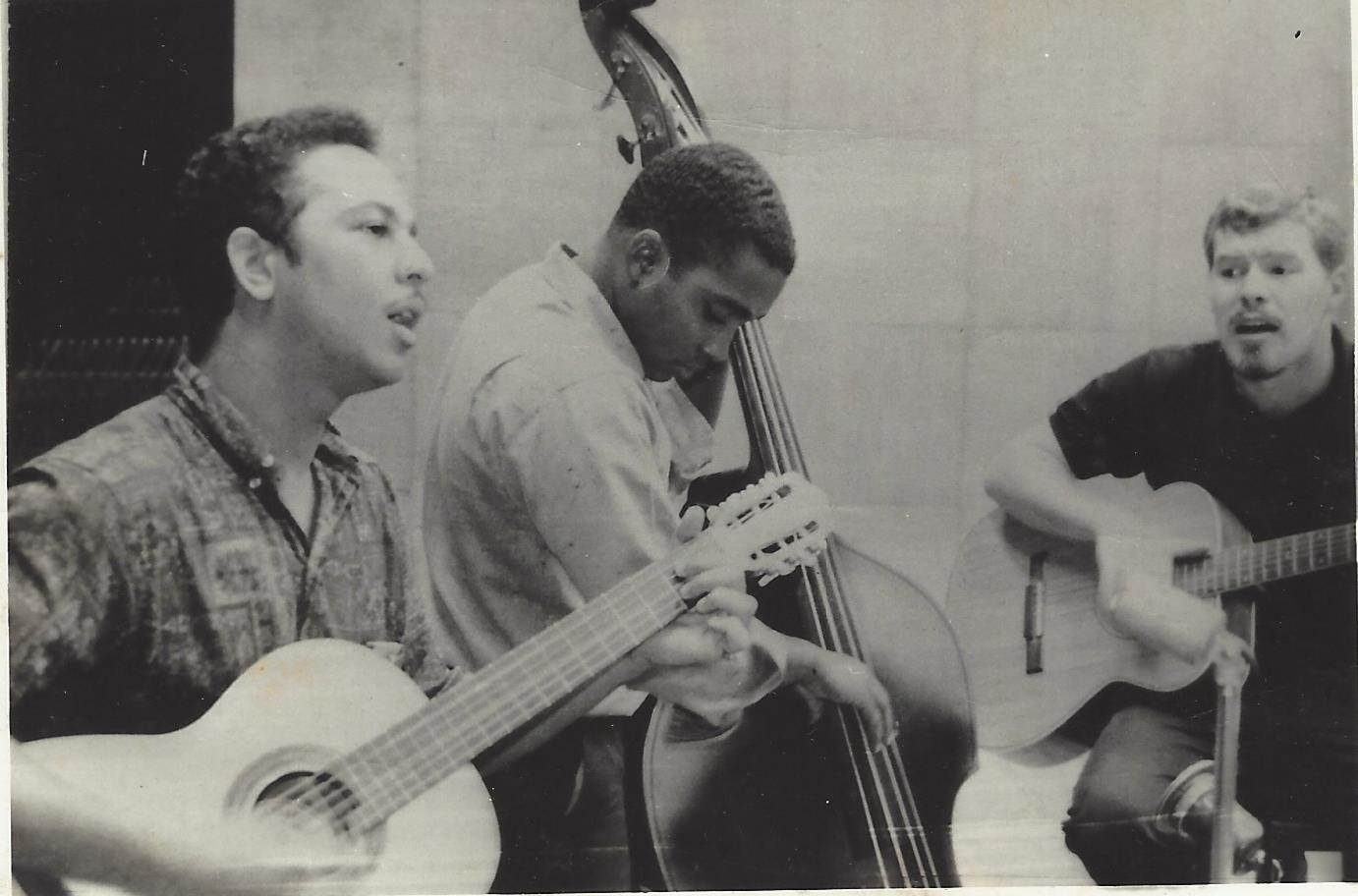
Colón Tarrats (center) with "The Casual Trio", circa 1965

Rubén Colón Tarrats was born on 9 March 1940 in New York, New York, while his parents, both Puerto Ricans, were visiting relatives in the Big Apple. His parents were Isaac Colón and Luz María Tarrats, both from Ponce. His family, including little Ruben Colón Tarrats, returned to Ponce before Colón Tarrats was a year old and he subsequently started his grade school in the public schools of the Ciudad Señorial.

== Training ==
Colón Tarrats studied music at Ponce's Escuela Libre de Música under Emilio Alvarado, Librado Net, and Rafael Franco. After graduating from Ponce High School, he entered Universidad Interamericana de Puerto Rico (UIA) where majored in music and learned music composition, choir conducting, and how to play the clarinet, among various other music studies. He joined the university choir and sang first bass in a group called Interamerican Concert Singers. He became associate director of said Singers group and toured the Caribbean, New England, and New York State. He graduated from UIA in 1963 with a Bachelor of Music and entered a Master's program in Music at Temple University, where he was a student of David L. Stone, founder of Temple University's Music College. At Temple, he was a member of the Opera and Concert Choir.

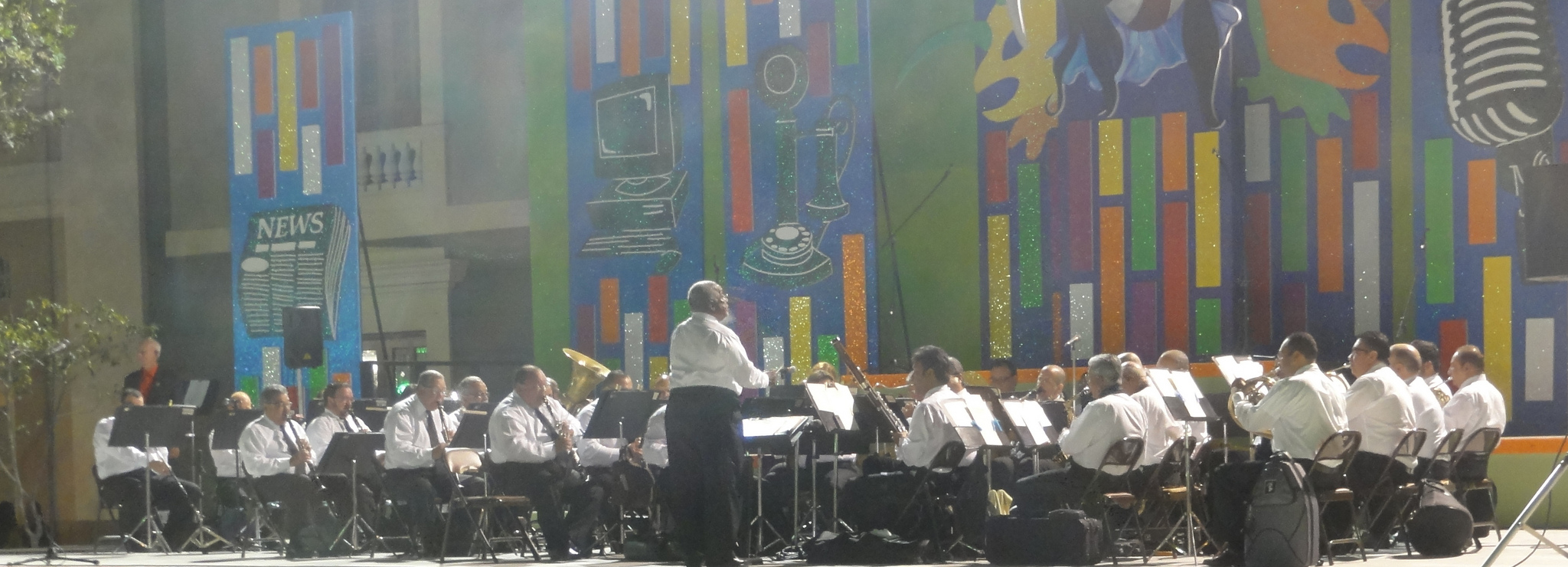
Colón Tarrats directing the Banda Municipal de Ponce during the Carnaval Ponceño in 2012

== Music career ==
Upon returning to the island, he joined the Puerto Rico Department of Education as a music teacher and school choir director in Ponce, where he taught at various Ponce public high schools and also lead the schools' choirs. While a music teacher, he created the Octeto de Ponce, a musical group of eight singers. He also joined the Vocal Instrumental Ars Nova and the Coral Polifónica de Ponce. During 1980 and 1981, he co-founded the Instituto de Música Juan Morel Campos where he also became professor of choir and music theory. Among his students are Alexander Rodríguez (director of Coro de la Academia Cristo Rey), Dennis Valdés-Brito Díaz (director of the Instituto de Música Juan Morel Campos and Universidad Interamericana-Ponce choirs), Víctor Quiles (director Ponce High School Choir), Hugo Adames (Director Coro de la Pontificia Universidad Católica de Puerto Rico Choir), José Rafael Morales and Mayte Morales Frau (co-directors of La Coral Municipal de Ponce).

From 1983 to 1999 he was director of the Coral Polifónica de Ponce and while under his direction, Coral Polifónica participated in the Festival Coral America Canta in Mar del Plata, Argentina, in 1983 and, in 1999, at Carnegie Hall, in New York City. In 1993-1994 he was choir director of the Coro de la Universidad Interamericana in Ponce and from 1994 to 1995 he was president of the Puerto Rican Association of Choir Directors. In 1994, he joined the teaching staff at the Pontificia Universidad Católica de Puerto Rico (PUCPR) and became the school's choir director. Under his leadership, the choir at the PUCPR recorded its first DVD of Christmas carols.

In 2003, former Ponce mayor Rafael Cordero Santiago named him director of the Banda Municipal de Ponce, a band that he conducted until November 2013.

In 2006 he co-founded Festival Internacional de Coros “Descubre a Puerto Rico y su Música Coral”, and international musical festival that takes places yearly in Ponce. In 2009, he created the Coral Municipal de Ponce for the Ponce Municipal Government, directing it until 2013. Also in 2009, he was a visiting professor of music at the Universidad Autónoma de Santo Domingo in the Dominican Republic promoted by the United States Embassy in Santo Domingo.

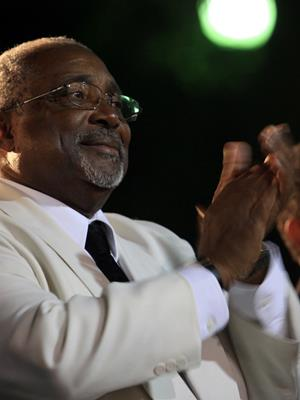
Colon Tarrats at the Festival Internacional de Coros “Descubre a Puerto Rico y su Música Coral” in March 2012

== Honors and legacy ==
Upon his retirement as director of the Banda Municipal de Ponce and the Coral Municipal de Ponce in November 2013, the municipality of Ponce honored him with a commemorative celebration at Teatro La Perla, attended by over 1,000 guests. The commemorative sketch for the occasion was a work by Wichie Torres.

On 13 December 2013 Colón Tarrats was recognized by the Municipality of Ponce as one of its illustrious citizens. He is recognized at the Ponce Tricentennial Park for his contributions to music.

In 2015, he was also honored by the Instituto de Cultura Puertorriqueña.

== Works ==
Colón Tarrats has authored nearly 200 chorals many of which are about Puerto Rican folklore, among which are several by Rafael Hernández Marín including El Cumbanchero, Silencio, Capullito de Alelí, Preciosa, Lamento Borincano, Romance, y Ahora Seremos Felices.

- Fantasía de Navidad, a musical (1986)
- Cantares Navideños
- Padre Nuestro
- Guakia Baba
- Shema Yisrael
- Salmo 46
- Dios mi Dios
- Pueblo de Israel
- Adonai Roi
- Oración de San Francisco
- Regalo de Reyes
- Ruiseñor
- Navidad Borincana
- Plegaria de Navidad
- Tributo Musical a Puerto Rico
- 25 de Enero

== See also ==
- Juan Morel Campos
- Domingo Cruz "Cocolía"
- Julio Alvarado Tricoche
- Luis Osvaldo Pino Valdivieso
- List of Puerto Ricans
- People from Ponce, Puerto Rico
