= Lolita Tizol =

Puerto Rican educator

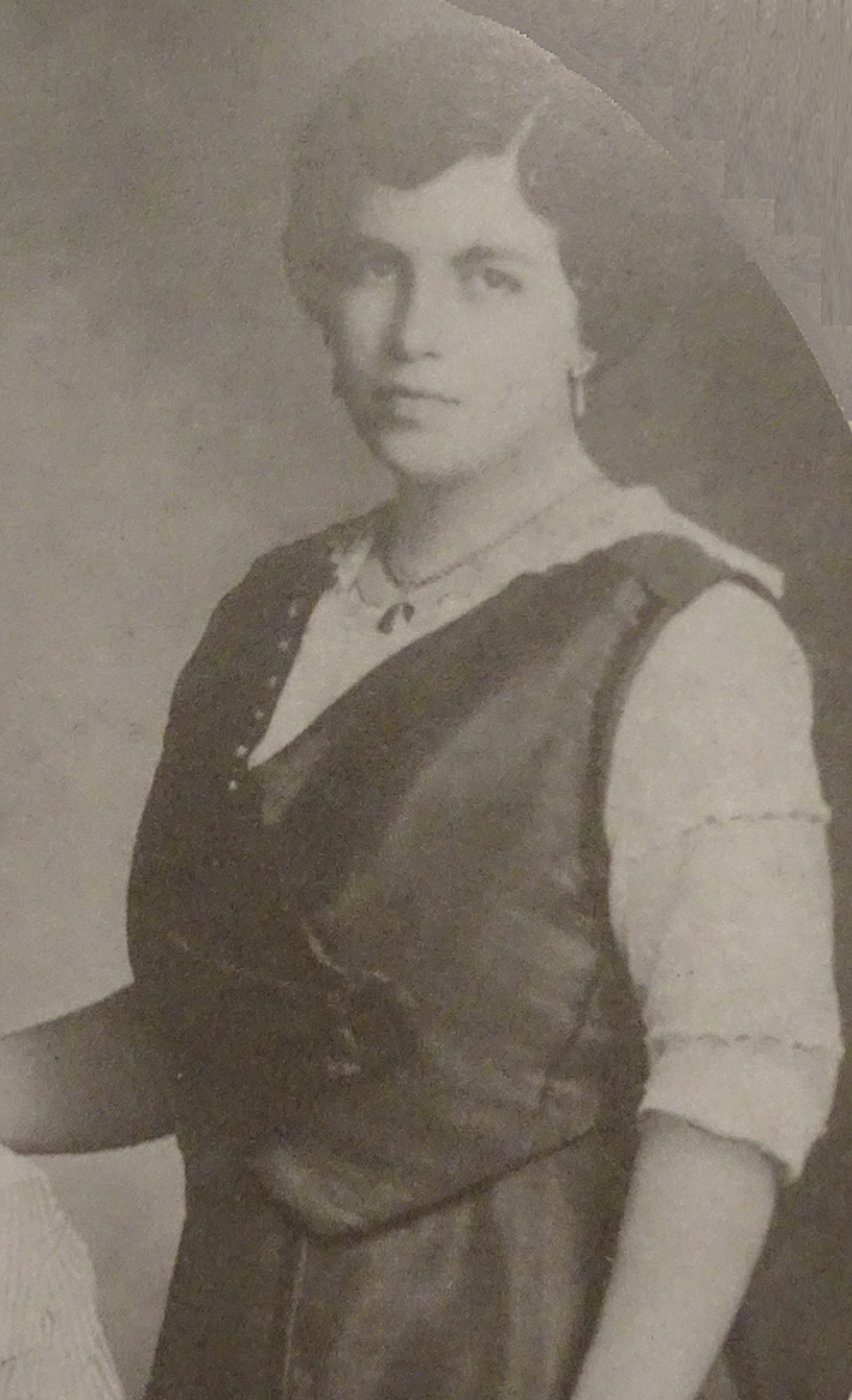
- Lolita Tizol, circa 1920
- Born: 19 June 1890; Ponce, Puerto Rico
- Died: 23 April 1933; Ponce, Puerto Rico
- Occupation: Educator
- Spouse: Jose Ortiz Lecodet

Lolita Tizol was an early twentieth-century Puerto Rican violinist and music educator from Ponce.

== Early years ==
Dolores "Lolita" Tizol Laguardia was born in Ponce, Puerto Rico on 19 June 1890. Her parents were Cosme Tizol and Saturnina Laguardia. She started her elementary education in Ponce, under the direction of Emilia Ribié de Christian in the Colegio Hermanas de la Caridad and in the American Free School.

When she was 10 years old she started taking music classes with his father who, seeing her musical aptitude, taught her to play the violin. She subsequently studied with Domingo Cruz ("Cocolía") and Aberrano Colón. She also studied under Brindis de Salas, the Cuban musician, while Salas was staying in Puerto Rico. As her musical abilities were further recognized, Lolita was offered a scholarship to study music in Boston. Her father, however, counseled her that in Puerto Rico music was not given the recognition that it deserved, and sent her to Alabama to study education and prepare her as a teacher. She married Jose Ortiz Lacodet, an attorney and poet.

== Teaching career ==
Tizol Laguardia graduated with a degree in Education and a specialization in Home Economics. Returning to Puerto Rico five years after leaving to Alabama, Tizol took the necessary Puerto Rico teachers' exam and started teaching in barrio Semil in Juana Diaz in 1909. A year later she taught in Coamo at Roman Baldorioty de Castro school and subsequently at the Segundo Ruiz Belvis school in Barrio Playa, Ponce. She was also principal at the Segundo Ruiz Belvis, Horace Mann, and Rafael Pujals schools, all in Ponce.

Tizol spent her life educating children at a time when most people in Ponce, as most of Puerto Rico, did not know how to read and write, and when teachers were paid only $50USD per month, even in the large cities. Under these circumstances, Tizol, overcoming all challenges, gave of herself to help others.

== School principal ==
In Ponce she also became school principal at the Rafael Pujals school. Tizol Laguardia was the first principal to institute a school lunch program and, later, a breakfast program for undernourished children.

== Other activities ==
Tizol Laguardia was also a member of the Ponce Symphony Orchestra. She also toured the island giving concerts.

== Honors ==
For her dedication and talent, a statue named Ponce Honra A Su Maestra: Lolita Tizol was erected in her memory adjacent to the Tricentennial Park in Ponce, with a plaque that reads: Ponce Honra A Su Maestra: Lolita Tizol (Ponce Honors its Teacher: Lolita Tizol). She died in Ponce on 25 April 1933, at age 42.

== Legacy ==
- There is a street in the Ponce Historic Zone named after her.
- In Ponce there is also a full-body statue of Tizol with two pupils.
- Also in Ponce, she is recognized at the Park for the Illustrious Ponce Citizens.

== See also ==
- List of Puerto Ricans
- Ponce Honra A Su Maestra: Lolita Tizol (statue)
