= Ponce Honra a su Maestra: Lolita Tizol =

Marble statue of Lolita Tizol

- Location of the statue within Puerto Rico
- Artist: Unknown
- Year: 1937
- Type: Marble
- Medium: Marble sculpture
- Subject: Lolita Tizol and two of her schoolchildren
- Condition: Pristine
- Location: Ponce, Puerto Rico; 18°0′46.8″N 66°36′31.9674″W
- Owner: Municipality of Ponce, PR

Ponce Honra a su Maestra: Lolita Tizol is a marble statue to the memory of Puerto Rican music schoolteacher Lolita Tizol. It is located on Bolevar Miguel Pou, at the fork of Isabel and Lolita Tizol streets, in Ponce, Puerto Rico. The statue has abundant visibility as it is located in an open area of Tricentennial Park.

== Background ==
Lolita Tizol Laguardia (1890 – 1933) was a Puerto Rican music educator from Ponce. When she was 10 years old she started taking music classes with his father who, seeing her musical aptitude, started teaching her to play the violin. She was a student of Domingo Cruz ("Cocolía") and Aberrano Colón. As her musical abilities were further recognized, Lolita was offered a scholarship to study music in Boston. Her father, however, counseled her that in Puerto Rico music was not given the recognition that it deserved, and sent her to Alabama to study education and prepare herself as a teacher. Returning to Puerto Rico she taught in Juana Diaz Coamo, and Ponce. In Ponce, she became principal at the Segundo Ruiz Belvis, Horace Mann, and Rafael Pujals schools. Tizol spent her life educating children at a time when most people in Ponce, as most of Puerto Rico, did not know how to read and write, and when teachers were paid only $50USD per month, even in the large cities. Under these circumstances, Tizol, "overcoming all challenges, gave of herself to help others". As a principal, Tizol Laguardia was the first principal to institute a school lunch program and, later, a breakfast program for undernourished children. She was also a member of the Ponce Symphony Orchestra, and toured the island giving concerts. She died in Ponce on 25 April 1933, at age 42.

== Description ==
The statue consists of three subjects: Lolita Tizol herself (center figure) plus two schoolchildren. To her left (from the viewer's point of view) is a school boy playing a violin and to her right is a schoolgirl reading a school book. The also-marble pedestal base of the monument has a carved message that reads: Ponce Honra a su Maestra (Ponce Honors Its Teacher). The statue was donated by Lolita Tizol's family to the municipality of Ponce on 19 November 1937. There is controversy as to who the sculptor of the statue is, and so far it is officially "unknown".
