= Luis Osvaldo Pino Valdivieso =

Director of the Ponce Municipal Band in Puerto Rico

- Born: Luis Osvaldo Pino Valdivieso; 14 November 1933; Ponce, Puerto Rico
- Died: 16 July 2003 (aged 69) Ponce, Puerto Rico
- Genre: danzas
- Occupations: violinist, band director
- Years active: 1953–2003

Luis Osvaldo Pino Valdivieso (1933–2003) was a Puerto Rican bombard player and director of the Banda Municipal de Ponce for twenty-three years.

== Early years ==
Luis Osvaldo Pino Valdivieso was born on 14 November 1933 in Ponce, Puerto Rico.

== Training ==
He began his music training in his own home and continued them at the Escuela Libre de Música de Ponce under Librado Net learning violin.

He also attended the Pontifical Catholic University of Puerto Rico earning a B.S. degree in Chemistry. He taught chemistry at the Ponce High School for 33 years. At Ponce High, he organized and established the Ponce High "Tuna Estudiantil" which he led between 1967 and 1974. Said musical organization recorded three LP records and won various awards in several competitions.

== Music career ==
In 1953 Pino Valdivieso joined the Ponce Municipal Band as first bombardist playing that sound until 1978, when he was named Band Director that year (1978). He held the directorship position until the summer of 2001.

Under the leadership of Pino Valdivieso, the Ponce Municipal Band achieved several milestones including the recording of two new LPs, participation in the Puerto Rican Day Parade in New York City in 1983, and the Fourth of July Parade in Washington, D.C., in 1991, as well as several musical competitions in Puerto Rico.

== Death, legacy and honors ==
Pino Valdivieso died in Ponce on 16 July 2003. He was 70 years old. In Ponce the building that houses the headquarters of the Ponce Municipal Band,"Centro Integrado Para el Fortalecimiento de las Artes Musicales Luis Osvaldo Pino Valdivieso", and located immediately next to Teatro La Perla, was named after him.

== See also ==
- Juan Morel Campos
- Domingo Cruz "Cocolía"
- Julio Alvarado Tricoche
- List of Puerto Ricans
- People from Ponce, Puerto Rico
