= Coro de la Pontificia Universidad Católica de Puerto Rico =

Catholic University in Ponce, Puerto Rico

- Choir
- Origin: Ponce, Puerto Rico
- Founded: 1950s; re-founded in 1973
- Genre: classical
- Members: 23 University students of the PUCPR
- Music director: Falina Rivera (1950s); Abel Di Marco (1973-1994); Rubén Colón Tarrats (1994-2017)
- Choirmaster: Hugo Adames (2017-)
- Choir admission: Yearly
- Affiliation: Pontificia Universidad Católica de Puerto Rico
- Awards: Aruba (1995); Florida (1998); New York (1999); Dominican Republic (2001); Chile (2005); Canada (2010); South Carolina (2011)

The Coro de Cámara de la Pontificia Universidad Católica de Puerto Rico (English: Resident Choir of the Pontifical Catholic University of Puerto Rico), more commonly referred to as the Coro de la PUCPR or simply El Coro de la Católica, is the choir of the Pontificia Universidad Católica de Puerto Rico in Ponce, Puerto Rico. It was founded in the 1950s and, after a period of inactivity, re-founded in 1973. The Choir was directed by Rubén Colón Tarrats until 2017. Colón Tarrats also directed the Ponce Municipal Band. Its current director is Dr. Hugo Adames.

== History of the Choir ==
The choir was founded in the 1950s by music professor Ms. Falina Rivera, but it became inactive soon after. The choir was re-founded in 1973 by Argentinian priest Abel Di Marco, when he established himself in Ponce. Rubén Colón Tarrats became its director in 1994, when Abel di Marco retired. In 2013, to commemorate the 40th anniversary of the choir, the university's music department prepared a Gala Concert dedicated to Abel Di Marco. In an interview given during this ceremony, Di Marco explained the circumstances of the re-creation of the choir:

El coro fue fundado en cincuenta y pico, pero desapareció en seguida. Cuando yo llegué en '73 le pregunté al vicepresidente ¿porqué no había coro? y él me dice: "no, parece que no hay muchachos, no..." y yo [dije]: "bueno, déjenmelo hacerlo; yo se lo hago gratis este semestre y después hablamos." (The choir was founded in early 1950s but it was dissolved soon after. When I arrived in 1973, I asked the vice-president why there wasn't a choir and he replied: "no, it seems there are not enough kids, no..." and I [said]: "Well, let me do it; I'll do it for free this semester and after that we will talk.")

== About the Choir ==
External videos
- You can view an honorary concert and ceremony for Father Abel Di Marco here.

The choir consists of 23 singers, all university students of the PUCPR. The choir, which has made numerous international presentations including one at St. Patrick's Cathedral in New York City, was also scheduled to sing at St. Peter's Basilica in the Vatican in 2013. In addition to solo performances at the Universidad Catolica de Puerto Rico, the Choir has participated in international performances, at home and abroad, including performances with the Ponce High School Choir, the University of Puerto Rico at Ponce Choir, the Instituto de Música Juan Morel Campos Choir, the Academia Cristo Rey Choir, and the Coral Municipal de Ponce.

== Accolades ==
The choir has received awards in Aruba (1995), Florida (1998), New York (1999), Dominican Republic (2001), Chile (2005), Canada (2010) and South Carolina (2011).

== See also ==
- Coro de Niños de Ponce
