= Epifanio Irizarry =

Puerto Rican painter

- Born: Epifanio Irizarry Jusino; 7 April 1915; Ponce, Puerto Rico
- Died: 3 November 2001 (aged 86); Ponce, Puerto Rico
- Education: Art Students League of New York, Freilassing Academy of Fine Arts
- Known for: Painting
- Notable work: Flamboyan (1972)
- Movement: Costumbrismo
- Awards: National Academy Museum and School Award; Guggenheim Memorial Foundation Grant
- Patrons: Museo de Arte de Ponce; Puerto Rico Museum of Art

Epifanio "Fano" Irizarry Jusino (7 April 1915 – 3 November 2001) was a Puerto Rican oil canvas painter, draftsman, and art professor from Ponce, Puerto Rico. He exposed Costumbrismo practices of his native Puerto Rico, including bomba and plena dances, cockfighting and carnivals. During his professional lifetime, he exhibited in Puerto Rico, the United States as well as Europe, some of which were solo, and he was the winner of various prestigious awards.

== Early years ==
Epifanio “Fano” Irizarry was born on 7 April 1915 on Calle Petardo in Clausells sector in Ponce. His parents were Ramón Irizarry, a cobbler, and Epifania Jusino, a homemaker. Since very young he showed an affinity for the arts and was encouraged to excel in painting by his father. He began his art studies with Inés Toro, and later was a student of Horacio Castaing, Librado Net and Miguel Pou.

In 1934 he moved to New York City where he took on various forms of employment and in 1941 he entered the United States Armed Forces. During his enlisted years he studied perspective in Germany and art at the Freilassing Art Academy, Bavaria, Germany, as well as at the Bavarian National Museum in Munich. He also lived in Paris, Toulouse, Lyon, and Reims, France as well as in Luxembourg.

== Schooling and career work ==
In the 1950s he studied at the Art Students League of New York under Reginald Marsh and Robert Brackman. He returned to Puerto Rico, and joined Taller de Gráfica of the División de Educación de la Comunidad where he was an illustrator until 1963. Subsequently, he returned to Ponce where he dedicated his time to his paintings and to art education. Some of his most outstanding students were Rigoberto Lucca Irizarry (1951–) and Ramón Luis Román (1949–).

"Irizarry was a genius in addition to a painter who with his art he memorialized into eternity the Puerto Rican Costumbrismo through themes like the bomba and plena dances, cockfighting and Paso Fino horses."

== Style and characteristics ==
Art critics describe his stroke as broad, energetic, free style and expressive. They define his paintings as reflecting life and movement. With respect to his use of color some critics point out to the liveliness and multiplicity of his tones, while others stress his sobriety and monochromatic style. His Marinas y Veleros watercolors are a witness to the passion that Irizarry had for the sea and the shore.

Wichie Torres stated that Irizarry was not only a lover of art but of opera music as well: "He loved to sing opera, and was good at it. So part of his daily ritual while painting was playing classical music and signing along in loud voice...Curiously, Irizarry never had a telephone. The reason was that he didn't want anyone interrupting him during his creative painting process."

== Paintings ==
Irizarry's works are preserved at the Museo de Arte de Ponce, Museo de Arte de Puerto Rico, Museo de los Santos y Arte Nacional in Puerto Rico, Riverside Art Museum in New York City and Instituto de Cultura de Madrid In Spain, and in private collections in Puerto Rico, United States, and Europe.

Among his outstanding works are:

- Baile de Bomba II (1951)
- Veleros (1957)
- Caras (1959)
- Feria de Caballos (1959)
- Baile de Bomba núm. 1 (1959)
- Pescadores de Muelles (1964)
- Flamboyan" (1972)
- La Bomba (1972)
- El Palo encebao (n.d.)

== Honors and legacy ==
During his successful art career he received awards from the Ateneo Puertorriqueño and the Instituto de Cultura Puertorriqueña as well as being the recipient of the National Academy Museum and School Award and the Guggenheim Memorial Foundation Grant.

The Ponce School of Fine Arts has an art gallery named after Irizarry. He is also honored at Ponce's Park of the Illustrious Ponce Citizens.

Irizarry died on 3 November 2001 in his native Ponce, Puerto Rico. He was 87 years old.

== See also ==
- List of Puerto Ricans
