= Coro de Niños de Ponce =

Children's choir in Ponce, Puerto Rico

- Choir
- Origin: Ponce, Puerto Rico
- Founded: 1983
- Genre: classical, danza
- Members: children below age of 18
- Music director: María Inés Suárez
- Organist: Ricardo Brull
- Choir admission: Yearly
- Orchestra admission: Children below age of 18
- Affiliation: Municipality of Ponce
- Associated groups: Coro de Concierto, Coro Elemental, Coro de Campanas de Ponce (Director: Nahir Mercado)
- Awards: First Place: 1993 International Children’s Choir Festival in Des Moines, Iowa
- Website: www.corodeninosdeponce.org; www.facebook/corodeninosdeponce

The Coro de Niños de Ponce (English: Ponce Children's Choir) is a children's choir in Ponce, Puerto Rico, founded in 1983. The choir is directed by founder María Inés Suárez. In 1993, the choir won first place at the International Children’s Choir Festival in Des Moines, Iowa.

== History of the choir ==
The choir was founded in 1983 by María Inés Suárez, and has operated continuously since. As of December 2015, its home base is at the Escuela Salustio Clavell, located in Urbanización Villa Flores, in Ponce, Puerto Rico.

== Venue ==
The choir's home venue is Teatro La Perla, but has also played at Concha Acústica amphitheater. During the Christmas holiday season, the choir donates its time in signing concerts throughout the city of Ponce performing for the less fortunate, including the elderly, the sick and weak, and at hospitals, churches and nursing homes. Since 2000, it has presented a Christmas concert every Christmas holiday season.

== About the choir ==
The choir is self-supporting, and includes in its sources of income donations. The Ponce Municipal Government has in the past approved donations from the city funds. The group consists of some 45 young singers. Its piano man is Ricardo Brull. In 1993, it won the First Place award during the 1993 International Children’s Choir Festival in Des Moines, Iowa. Some of the more common interpretations of the choir are Vivaldi, Mozart and Fauré, as well as Juan Morel Campos. The Choir has sung with the likes of Paloma San Basilio, Ruth Fernández, Ednita Nazario, Tony Croatto, Draco Rosa, Danny Rivera, Antonio Barasorda, César Hernández and Rafael Dávila.

== See also ==
- Coro de la Pontificia Universidad Católica de Puerto Rico
