= Julio Alvarado Tricoche =

Puerto Rican flutist, composer, and band director

- Born: Julio Alvarado Tricoche; 18 February 1886; Ponce, Puerto Rico
- Died: 24 September 1970 (aged 84) Ponce, Puerto Rico
- Genres: danzas, plenas, valls, polkas, boleros and danzones
- Occupations: flutist, composer, and band director
- Years active: 1912-1970
- Formerly of: Mingo and the Whoopee Kids, Ponce Municipal Band

Julio Alvarado Tricoche (1886–1970) was a Puerto Rican flutist, composer, and director of the Banda Municipal de Ponce for seventeen years.

== Early years ==
Julio Alvarado Tricoche was born on 18 February 1886 in Ponce, Puerto Rico. His father was Spaniard and his mother was Puerto Rican. Alvarado Tricoche was the first male baby born at the just-built Hospital Valentín Tricoche. As a young man he worked as a blacksmith and a tobacco salesperson before he dedicated the rest of his life to music.

== Training ==
In 1903 he started playing the guitar with music professor Clemente Acosta. He studied music theory and flute with Jesús R. Ramos Antonini and for his advanced music education Alvarado Tricoche was a student of Domingo Cruz (Cocolía) and Juan Ríos Ovalle.

== Music career ==
Alvarado Tricoche started in the world of music from very young. He first performed with the flute.

In 1912, Domingo Cruz "Cocolía", then director of the Ponce Municipal Band contracted Julio Alvarado as flutist and conductor.

Alvarado Tricoche initiated his work as a composer in 1914, creating danzas, valses, pasodobles, pasillos, boleros and plenas. Among his favorite themes was love and womanhood. His romantic melodies continue to be played in modern Puerto Rico. Among his best known compositions are Ausencia (1920), Una Noche de Algodon (1926), Ambición (1938), Lejos de ti (1937) and Cenizas (1942).

In 1920, Alvarado Tricoche became director of the Ponce School Band and also joined the Ponce Symphony Orchestra whose conductor was Arturo Pasarell. Concurrent with his duties directing two bands (the municipal and school bands) and as a member of the Symphony Orchestra, he also participated in various local for-profit bands and orchestras working, among them, with Mingo and his Whoopee Kids band as an arranger, guitarist, and flutist.

From 1937 to 1955, he directed the Orchestra at the Ponce Casino and was also a professor of music theory (solfeo) at the Escuela Libre de Música de Ponce, then headquartered at Salud and Cristina streets. In 1953 he became director of the Banda Municipal de Ponce, which he directed until his death.

== Death, legacy and honors ==
Alvarado Tricoche directed the Ponce Municipal Band from 1953 until his death (24 September 1970). He was 84 years old. Under his direction, the Band achieved much recognition and received many accolades, both in Puerto Rico as well as internationally. In Ponce a school was named after him. He is also recognized at the Ponce Tricentennial Park for his contributions to music.

== Personal life ==
Alvarado Tricoche married Georgina Santos and they had six children: Emilio, Georgina, Luisa Angélica, Julio, Antonia and Santiago.

== See also ==
- Juan Morel Campos
- Domingo Cruz "Cocolía"
- Luis Osvaldo Pino Valdivieso
- List of Puerto Ricans
- People from Ponce, Puerto Rico
