= Librado Net =

Puerto Rican educator, painter and musician

Librado Net Pérez
- Born: 17 August 1895; Ponce, Puerto Rico
- Died: 2 November 1964 (aged 69); Ponce, Puerto Rico
- Known for: Painting
- Notable work: Erupción del Monte Vesubio (1911); Detalle escultórico del Arco del Triunfo (1911); La musa del crepúsculo (1936); Luna sobre la costa-Staten Island (1922); Clove Lake-Staten Island (1925); Dibujo de edificios en Nueva York; Paisaje en Nueva York; Puente sobre el Río Inabón en la finca La Concordia (1939); Parque de Bombas (1950); Calle León (1960); Teatro La Perla (1960); Playa de Ponce cerca del Yacht Club (1964)
- Movement: pre-Raphaelite, Raphaelite
- Spouse: Eugene Batiste
- Children: Roberto
- Patrons: Casa Wiechers

Librado Net
- Genres: Danza
- Occupations: Musician, educator, first director of Escuela Libre de Música de Ponce
- Instruments: Flute, violin

Librado Net Pérez (1895-1964) was a Puerto Rican musician, educator and painter from Ponce, Puerto Rico. He was the first director of the Escuela Libre de Música de Ponce, considered the best of Puerto Rico's free Music Schools at the time. He directed the school from the early 1950s and continuing until just prior to his death in 1964.

== Early years ==
Librado Net was born in Ponce, Puerto Rico, on 17 August 1895. His parents were Ramón Net Santiago and Sofía Pérez Torres. He was introduced to music by his mother. He was a student of Arístides Chavier, Domingo Cruz "Cocolia" and Castro Pérez. In the art of painting, he was a student of Miguel Pou, and among his own painting students was Epifanio Irizarry. In architecture he studied with Alfredo Wiechers, who taught him to work with watercolors and tapestry.

From a very young age, he showed dexterity in leadership and talent in orchestral organization and in the interpretation of musical works via the flute, and the violin. In the 1920s, he lived in the United States, where he studied music with Jean Bedetti. He married sculptor Eugene Batiste, and had a son, Roberto. Librado Net was the first director of the Escuela Libre de Música de Ponce (Ponce Free School of Music), starting in the 1950s and continued as such until just prior to his death. He was better known for his musical skills than his other artistic interests.

== Music school director ==
Librado Net worked with Ernesto Ramos Antonini from the planning to the implementation phases of Puerto Rico's three free schools of music in San Juan, Ponce, and Mayaguez. The schools were inaugurated on 1 December 1946. Thanks to the work of Net, it is said that "the Ponce Free School of Music was the most outstanding." He became the first director of the Instituto de Música Juan Morel Campos.

The school was also the teaching venue of Tomás Clavel, Julio Alvarado, Emilio Alvarado, Rafael Franco, Eduardo Pérez Jusino, Bernardo Gaztambide, Luis Marguerie and Edwin Ramos Torres.

== Works ==
Net's rise to fame came with his work on tapestry under Alfredo Wiechers. He created Erupción del Monte Vesubio (1911), Detalle escultórico del Arco del Triunfo (1911) and La musa del crepúsculo (1936). The first are in the permanent collection of the Casa Wiechers, property of the Instituto de Cultura Puertorriqueña. His artistic style is pre-Raphaelite and Raphaelite. From his years in New York, he created Luna sobre la costa-Staten Island (1922), Clove Lake-Staten Island (1925), Dibujo de edificios en Nueva York, and Paisaje en Nueva York, among others. Upon his return to Puerto Rico, he recorded street scenes in Ponce, including Puente sobre el Río Inabón en la finca La Concordia (1939), Parque de Bombas (1950), Calle León (1960), Teatro La Perla (1960), and Playa de Ponce cerca del Yacht Club (1964).

== Last years and death ==
Librado Net died in Ponce on 2 November 1964.

== Legacy ==
- In Ponce there is a school in the community of San Antonio that bears his name.
- He is recognized at the Ponce Tricentennial Park for his contributions to music and painting.
- There is also a street named after him in the Pastillo de Canas community in barrio Canas, Ponce.
- There is a garden at the Instituto de Musica Juan Morel Campos named after Net.

== See also ==
- List of Puerto Ricans

== Bibliography ==
- El Mundo, 26 December 1953, p. 11.
- Homenaje póstumo a Don Librado Net Pérez. El Mundo, 28 January 1967, p. 43.
- El Mundo, 12 August 1953, p. 13.
- El Mundo, 22 May 1959, p. 34. Recibe Homenaje, Librado Net se jubila Escuela Música Ponce.
- El Mundo, 5 March 1967, p. 17.
- La Casa de la Reina 106 Page 10. Accessed 16 January 2011.
