= Miguel Pou =

Puerto Rican painter (1880–1968)

- Miguel Pou
- Born: Miguel Pou y Becerra; 24 August 1880; Ponce, Puerto Rico
- Died: 6 May 1968; San Juan, Puerto Rico
- Education: Art Students League, Pennsylvania Academy of the Fine Arts
- Known for: Painting
- Notable work: Los Coches de Ponce; La Promesa; La Piquiña; Mi Hijo Jaime; La Catedral de Ponce
- Movement: Impressionism
- Awards: Institute of Puerto Rican Culture; Ateneo Puertorriqueño; Ponce Progressive League
- Patrons: Museo de Arte de Ponce; Puerto Rico Museum of Contemporary Art; Puerto Rico Museum of Art

Miguel Pou Becerra (24 August 1880 – 6 May 1968) was a Puerto Rican oil canvas painter, draftsman, and art professor. Together with José Campeche and Francisco Oller, he has been called "one of Puerto Rico's greatest masters." He was an exponent of the impressionist movement. During his life he exhibited in 64 shows, of which 17 were solo, and won five gold medals.

== Early years ==
Miguel Pou was born in Ponce, Puerto Rico, to Juan Bautista Pou Carreras and Margarita Becerra Julbe. Pou took drawing and painting lessons in Ponce. He began drawing with Pedro Clausells and painting with Spaniard Santiago Meana.

== Schooling and career work ==
After receiving a Bachelor of Arts from the Provincial Institute of Ponce in 1898, he worked as a teacher with the Department of Education. He became a public school teacher at age 20, and assistant superintendent in the Ponce School District in 1900.

In 1906, he completed the methodology course in teaching drawing at the Hyannis Normal School (now the Hyannis State Teachers College) in Massachusetts, United States. In 1909, he became director of the Dr. Rafael Pujals School in Ponce. He also married in 1909, to Ana Valldejuly. Ana Valldejuly was an educator. They had one son, Jaime, who became a physician.

== Art school ==
In 1910 he established the Miguel Pou Academy in Ponce, an art school that stimulated numerous youngsters to develop an interest in art. He directed his school for the next forty years, until 1950. He was very much admired for his artistic works in Puerto Rico. In 1919, he briefly interrupted his presence at the art school to further his studies. In that year he studied in the United States at the Art Students League in New York City and in 1935 at the Philadelphia Academy of Fine Arts. Miguel Pou studied painting and drawing intensively and also taught art.

Among his pupils are Epifanio Irizarry, José R. Alicea, José Manuel Cintrón Pou and Juan Emilio Viguié. Also among his disciples are Olga Albizu, Horacio Castaign, Rafael Ríos Rey, and Luis Quero Chiesa. José Martínez Narváez, Miguel Rodríguez, Librado Net, Pedro Pacheco, Orlando Santiago, Ángel Miguel González, Félix Cordero, Ariel Rodríguez, Waldemar Morales, and Margarita Sastre de Balmaceda.

== Style and characteristics ==
Pou's masterpiece "Los Coches de Ponce" (1926) is available for viewing at the Museo de Arte de Ponce

Miguel Pou's was generally impressionistic in his style. He painted Puerto Rican landscapes and jibaro-type paintings. Pou did not have a political statement to make. He wanted to capture the ideal of what a jibaro or jibara was. He painted the beauty that the people and the land had from both the physical and spiritual perspectives while synergistically merging the two. "His work is considered impressionistic because of his use of a palette of colors and of light, although he presented reality as he saw it, without softening or exaggerating it. Nevertheless, he is a painter of the realist school because of his effort to depict Puerto Rican reality."

Pou's masterpiece "Los Coches de Ponce" (1926) received many awards. (Note: Pou painted Los Coches de Ponce in 1926. Los Coches de Ponce is on display at Museo de Arte de Ponce. Fourteen years after this, in 1940, Pou painted a similar theme titled Las Calesas de Ponce. This later work is on display at Museo de Arte de Puerto Rico.) By 1926 he had considerably perfectioned his art form from the days of "Las Lavanderas" (1896). By 1926 he had established a name for himself, and Los "Coches de Ponce" helped positioned Pou among Puerto Rico's greatest oil canvas painters. "Los Coches de Ponce" portrays Pou's inclination for everyday life scenes that so readily help identify Pou as an impressionistic movement painter. "Los Coches de Ponce" can be seem at Museo de Arte de Ponce

He liked to portray what the artist called "regional types". In terms of subject matter, he aimed to reflect the soul of the Puerto Rican people and a way of life he feared was being blown by the winds of modernity. His best work was local, embracing the land, its people, and their customs. Like Campeche and Oller before him, Pou helped to define the national character of Puerto Rico during his lifetime, and he added to Puerto Rico's artistic tradition in equally important ways.

According to the Worcester Art Museum, "Miguel Pou... shows thorough command of the concerns of the Ashcan school, and applied it to the depiction of local types." The importance he places on light and color in his paintings reflects the influence of impressionism. He was inspired by the rural and urban landscapes, popular characters, and the human figure.

== Paintings ==
Pou's works have been exhibited in many Puerto Rican towns, North America, Madrid and Barcelona, and Paris.

Outstanding paintings by Pou are:

- Los Coches de Ponce (The Horse Carriages of Ponce) [1926];
- La Promesa (The Promise) [1928];
- Mi Hijo Jaime (My Son Jaime) [1927];
- Las Calesas de Ponce (The Horse Buggies of Ponce) [1940];
- La Catedral de Ponce (The Ponce Cathedral).

There is a reproduction of Los Coches de Ponce at the Yale-New Haven Teachers Institute. Some of his works are in permanent exhibition in the Puerto Rican Artists gallery at the Museo de Arte de Ponce. The paintings Los Coches de Ponce (1926), La Promesa (1928), Raza Soñadora - Retrato de Ciquí (1938), and Mi Hijo Jaime (1927), are available at the Museo de Arte de Ponce.<

== Recognitions ==
Pou's work has been recognized in Puerto Rico, the United States, and Paris.

In addition to exhibiting his work on the island, he participated in collective exhibitions such as the Paris Colonial Exhibition (1931), the National Exhibition of American Art in New York (1938), and the Second Biennial Exhibition of Spanish American Art in Madrid (1951). The Institute of Puerto Rican Culture held a retrospective exhibition of his work in 1957.

Among the prizes he was awarded were two gold medals in the Ponce Progressive League competition for his works Los Coches de Ponce and Retrato a Pluma del tío Ramón (1914), a medal and certificate of honor from the Puerto Rican Athenaeum for his work El tío Ramón (1924) and a gold medal for his contributions to the culture of Puerto Rico from the Institute of Puerto Rican Culture (1960).

Today, some of his works can be seen at the Museo de Arte de Ponce, Museum of Contemporary Art in San Juan, at the Museum of History, Anthropology and Art at the University of Puerto Rico's Río Piedras campus and at the Puerto Rico Museum of Art.

== Last years and death ==
In 1966, Pou was the first director of the Escuela de Artes Plásticas de Puerto Rico (School of Visual Arts of Puerto Rico), an institution of higher learning in the visual arts in San Juan. Miguel Pou Becerra died in San Juan, Puerto Rico, on 6 May 1968. He was buried at Cementerio Católico San Vicente de Paul in Ponce.

== Honors and legacy ==
In Ponce there is a major thoroughfare named after Miguel Pou. The boulevard is the most popular entrance to the Ponce historic district, and leads from the intersection of PR-1 and PR-2 into the center of the city.

He is also honored at Ponce's Park of the Illustrious Ponce Citizens.

== See also ==
- List of Puerto Ricans
