= Juan Morel Campos (statue) =

Statue of Puerto Rican composer

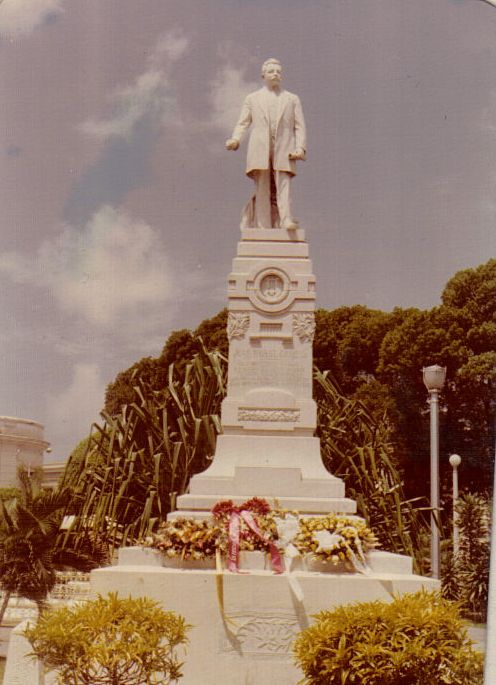

- Location of the statue within Puerto Rico
- Artist: Luiggi Tomassi; Pietrasanta, Italy
- Year: 1926
- Type: Marble
- Movement: Beaux Arts
- Condition: Pristine
- Location: Plaza Degetau Ponce, Puerto Rico; 18°00′41.44″N 66°36′49.86″W
- Owner: Municipality of Ponce, Puerto Rico

Juan Morel Campos is a statue to the memory of a Puerto Rican composer and danza master Juan Morel Campos located at Plaza Las Delicias in Ponce, Puerto Rico. The statue's large marble pedestal follows in the Beaux Arts architectural tradition. Within the pedestal are the mortal remains of the composer.

== Background ==
Morel Campos was born in Ponce, Puerto Rico. He began to study music at the young age of eight in his hometown. Morel Campos learned to play practically every brass instrument and eventually became one of the founders and directors of the "Ponce Firemen's Band" (La Banda de Bomberos del Parque de Bombas de Ponce). The legendary Band was later renamed the Ponce Municipal Band. The band still plays today. Morel Campos composed over 550 musical works before he died unexpectedly at age 38. His unexpected death was the result of a stroke he suffered while performing with his band on stage during a concert in Ponce on 26 April 1896. He died three days after event, on 16 May 1896. In December 1926, his remains were buried at the foot of his statue in Plaza Las Delicias.

== Description ==
The statue (and its pedestal) are marble. It is the product of the foundry of Italian sculptor Luiggi Tomassi in Pietrasanta, Italy. It was unveiled on 12 December 1926. Stored within statue's pedestal are Juan Morel Campos's remains. He had been initially buried in niche #3, West Wall, First Line, at Ponce's old cemetery, now called Panteón Nacional Román Baldorioty de Castro, but, in December 1926, his remains were moved to be reburied in a niche at the foot of his statue in Plaza Las Delicias. The 1926 cost to build the statue was $3,000 ($54,558 in 2025 dollars).

== Accolades ==
In 2017, Frank Arias created a 16"x20" acrylic on paper canvas painting of the statue.
