= Luis Torres Nadal =

Puerto Rican artist (1943–1986)

- Born: Luis Torres Nadal; 4 July 1943; Ponce, Puerto Rico
- Died: 15 May 1986 (aged 42); Ponce, Puerto Rico
- Known for: Actor, Playwright, Poet, Educator, Choreographer, and theatrical director

Luis Torres Nadal (4 July 1943 – 15 May 1986) was a Puerto Rican playwright, poet, educator, actor, choreographer, and theatrical director.

== Early years ==
Torres Nadal was born at 67 Aurora Street, in the Ponce Historic Zone on 4 July 1943. He was the youngest son of Isaías Torres Santiago and Ana Inés Nadal Delegue. He studied at the Colegio Ponceño de Varones, which at that time was a boys-only school, and graduated from Ponce High School in 1961.

== Schooling and training ==
Upon graduation from the Pontifical Catholic University of Puerto Rico in 1965 with a B.A. degree in History and Literature, he traveled to the United States to study at the University of Wisconsin–Madison in Madison, Wisconsin. There he earned a Master's degree in Hispanic Studies with a concentration in theatrical arts. His thesis titled "The Theater of Francisco Arrivi" received an honorific mention.

== Prominence and style ==
According to Lilliane Pérez-Marchand and Dr. Piri Fernández de Lewis, Torres Nadal was a unique case in Puerto Rico's cultural history "not only for his precocious formulation of new forms of theater and poetry, but also for his foresight of the forms of drama of his time."

=== Poetry ===
As a poet, he was considered one of the best in Puerto Rico and Latin America. His poetry style consisted of ripping wide open the intention of the poet through his voice and his movements. It raised him to first place in his genre. In so doing he not only inherited, but also cultivated the style of his masters Dr. Arturo Machuca Padín, Leopoldo Santiago Lavandero and Alberto Rodríguez. Some of his poems were "Ritual de una voz dolida" (Ritual of a Hurt Voice), "Poema del mar" (Poem of the Sea), "La espera infinita" (The Infinite Wait), and "La angustia vencida" (Overcome Anguish).

=== Ballet ===
Luis Torres Nadal also stood out in the world of ballet. He was a student of William (Bill) Sarazen of the Puerto Rico School of Ballet. He also studied at the Ballet de San Juan Ballet Company. In New York he was a student at Joffrey Ballet and at the School of American Ballet. He founded the Ballet Teatro de Puerto Rico theatrical ballet company. He taught dance and ballet at the Puerto Rico School of Dance and at the Julie Mayoral Academy of Dance.

=== Playwright ===
As a playwright he is considered a bridge between the generation of realists Puerto Rican writers and the post-Luis Rafael Sánchez writers. His interest centered on placing the Puerto Rican man and woman, from a humanistic perspective, into the global scene in the theatrical world. His theatrical works are the best witness of his sensibility and grave interest in the human destiny. Among his theatrical works are "El asesinato de la mariposa" (The Murder of the Butterfly), "La cena gentil" (The Gracious Dinner), "Responso para una reina difunta" (Prayer for a Dead Queen), "La víspera del día después" (The Eve of the Day After), "A las once en punto y sereno" (At Eleven O'Clock and Calm), "La santa noche del sábado" (Saturday's Holy Night), y "El problema de papá" (Papa's Problem). He also authored the monologues "La actriz" (The actress) and "Esa blanca rosa de papel" (That White Paper Rose).

=== Theatrical Director ===
It is said that from a young age Torres Nadal had wanted to leave a real and recognized theatrical movement in his hometown of Ponce. He started directing theatrical works when he was 16 years old. He directed the following performances: "Cuatro y Ernesto" (1972), "El asesinato de la mariposa" (The Murder of the Butterfly) [1973], "Collage para un teatro total" [1973], "Tiempo muerto" (Dead Time) [1974], "Muerte y transfiguración" (1974), "La víspera del día después" [1974], "Encrucijada" [1974], "María Soledad" [1975], "La fortuna y los ojos del hombre", "Bert (Los entendidos)", "Esta noche juega el joker" [1976], "Aventuras de Pinocho" [1976], "Mujeres" [1977], "Los cuentos de Juan Bobo" [1983], "El hombre elefante" [1984], "La vendedora de cerillas" [1984], "El árbol de las siete hojas de oro" [1985], "El hombre de las cien manos" y "Los pasteleros".

== Rising fame ==
He was a cornerstone for the founding of the Pontifical Catholic University of Puerto Rico's theater workshop. There, he directed his version of "Marianela", "Todos los ruiseñores cantan" (All the Nightingales Sing), and his biggest dream, "West Side Story" [1986]. His theatrical arts productions in the city of Ponce converted Ponce into an important center of the theatrical arts as he made the world debut of his versions of "La charca" [1985], and "Doña Bárbara" [1986] there: "Torres Nadal was a faithful defender of the Ponce theater." From 1985 to 1988, he was a member of the Governing Board of the Ponce Municipal Teatro La Perla, where he is said to have "always been respected by his colleagues, and where he was a motive of inspiration and admiration by the Governing Board members.

== Last years and death ==
Torres Nadal made a short incursion into theatrical productions, directing as well as producing in "El Lazarillo de Tormes" (The Guide of Tormes The Blind), and "El problema de papá" (Dad's Problem). His last endeavors in the theatrical arts were widely accepted and were received with great anticipation, a testimony of his rising fame. His last work as theatrical director was with Compañía Ponceña Guarionex, Inc., in the work and production of "Sirena", as part of the Instituto de Cultura Puertorriqueña's 13th Festival of the Theater in Ponce, The Festival took place from April 25–27, 1986, just two weeks before his death. Two days prior to his death he had also submitted to the trustees of the Pontifical University of Puerto Rico his master plan for the creation of the Department of Dramatic Arts at that institution of higher learning.

Then, in the early hours of Thursday, May 15, 1986, Torres Nadal was murdered in his hometown of Ponce. His death was mourned by family and friends alike, as his lifeless body was presented for public viewing at the very theater that had seen the results of his brilliant work, Teatro La Perla. He was buried at Cementerio Civil de Ponce.

== Legacy ==
Teatro La Perla holds a yearly theater festival during the month of February in honor of Torres Nadal. "Luis Torres Nadal left as his legacy a festival that after 22 years still marches on." It is called Festival de Teatro Luis Torres Nadal. It was first celebrated in 1987.

In Ponce there is a street named in his honor. It is located in Urbanización Río Canas, south of Avenida Las Américas (PR-163), west of Avenida Baramaya (PR-9), north of Ponce By-pass (PR-2) and east of Avenida Pámpanos (PR-2R).

For his dedication and talent, there is a plaque in his memory in a Ponce city park, Tricentennial Park.

== See also ==
- List of Puerto Ricans
