= Colegio Ponceño =

Roman Catholic, Piarist, pre K-12 preparatory school located in Ponce, Puerto Rico

Coordinates: 18°02′36.25″N 66°34′30.70″W

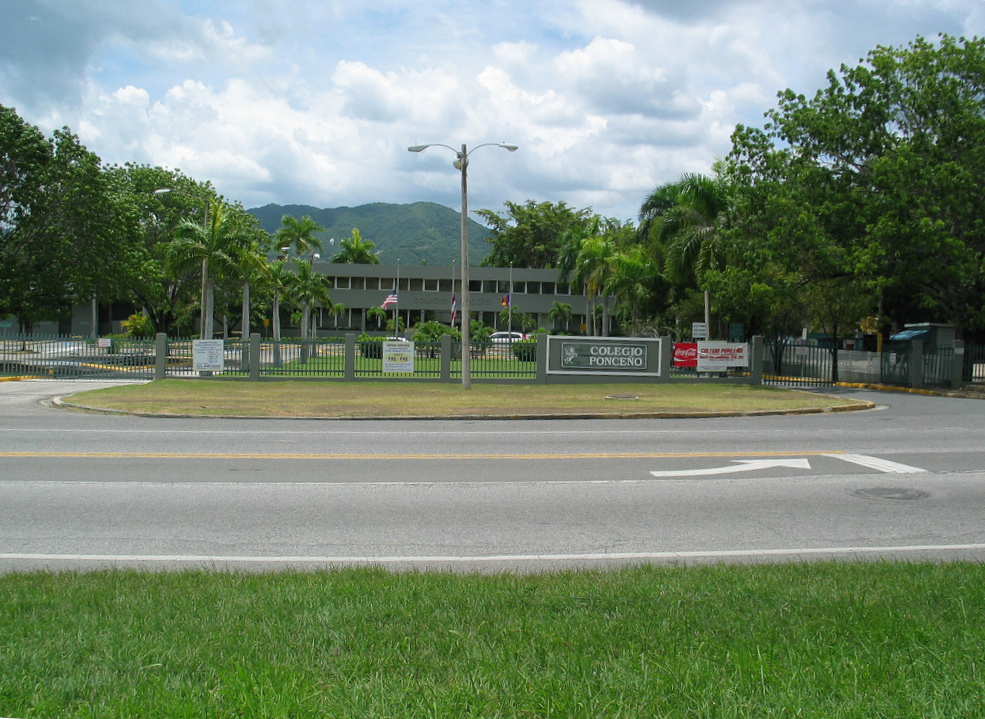

Location
- 1900 Carr 14, Coto Laurel PR 00780; Puerto Rico

Information
- Type: Private School
- Motto: Piedad y Letras
- Established: 1 August 1926
- Faculty: Lay: 95%; Clergy: 5%. Male: 27%; Female: 73%
- Grades: PK-12
- Enrollment: 1068 students Pk-12. Around 340 from 9-12
- Colors: Purple & Gold
- Mascot: El Cruzado
- Accreditation: Puerto Rico Department of Education & Middle States Association of Colleges and Schools
- Main Holiday: Feast of Our Lady of the Pillar and of Saint Joseph Calasanz
- Award: 2005 International Award of Educational Excellence, by Ibero-American Council to Honor Educational Quality
- Award: 1991 & 1992 U.S. Department of Education Blue Ribbon School
- Website: www.copin.net

Colegio Ponceño is a Roman Catholic, Piarist, pre K-12 preparatory school located in Ponce, Puerto Rico. The institution "has been recognized by the College Board as the best among public and private schools in Puerto Rico during the last 14 years." It has been regarded as one of the "most prestigious private schools in the city [of Ponce]."

== History ==
The school was founded in 1926 as Colegio Ponceño de Varones, by Miss Maria Serra Gelabert, a Catholic laywoman and catechist, as a boys-only Catholic school sponsored by the Bishop of Ponce, Msgr. Edwin Vincent Byrne. It was located on a rented house on Calle Comercio. It later moved to its own facility on Calle Aurora, and in 1974 it moved to its current facility on PR-14.

From 1930 to 1968 the school was directed by the Marianist Brothers. In 1968, the Piarist Fathers (Padres Escolapios) took over its administration, called by Msgr. Juan Fremiot Torres Oliver, Bishop of Ponce.

Under the Piarist administration the school's name was changed to "Colegio Ponceño" upon becoming a coed school in 1973. As a Piarist school, Colegio Ponceño follows the Catholic educational philosophy of Saint Joseph Calasanz and is administered by the Piarist Fathers Province of the United States and Puerto Rico. The school is owned by a Parent's Board of Trustees founded by the Bishop of Ponce.

== Location ==
The school was originally located on Luna Street in downtown Ponce. In 1973, it moved to its new facilities on PR-14. It is now located in Barrio Coto Laurel in Ponce.

== Accreditation ==
Colegio Ponceño is accredited by the Puerto Rico Department of Education and by the Middle States Association of Colleges and Schools. It is a permanent member of the College Board, serving as test center for the ATP of the College Board. It was recognized in 1991 and 1992 as a U.S. Department of Education Blue Ribbon School.

== Directors ==
- Rev. P. José A. Basols, Sch.P. (2025–present)
- Rev. P. Manuel Sanchez, Sch. P. (2023-2025)
- Rev. P. Luis Cruz, Sch.P. (2021-2023)
- Rev. P. José A. Basols, Sch.P. (2017-2021)
- Rev. P. Emilio Sotomayor, Sch.P. (2015-2017)
- Rev. P. Fernando Torres Lanause, Sch.P. (2008- 2015)
- Rev. P. Juan Cabrerizo, Sch.P. (2007-2008)
- Rev. P. José A. Basols, Sch.P. (2003-2007)
- Rev. P. Juan Cabrerizo, Sch.P. (1995-2003)
- Rev. P. José A. Basols, Sch.P. (1983-1995)
- Rev. P. Emilio Calcena, Sch.P. (1982-1983)
- Rev. P. José M. Clavero, Sch.P. (1976-1982)
- Rev. P. José Mateo, Sch.P. (1969-1976)

== Trivia ==
The school mascot is a Crusader ("El Cruzado") and the school main holidays are the feasts of Our Lady of the Pillar and of Saint Joseph Calasanz. The school colors are purple and gold ("Púrpura y Oro").

== Notable alumni ==
- Juan "Pachín" Vicéns
- Luis Torres Nadal
- Debora Seilhamer
