= Rafael Ríos Rey =

Puerto Rican muralist (1911-1980)

- Born: Rafael Ríos Reyes; 28 July 1911; Ponce, Puerto Rico
- Died: 29 April 1980; San Juan, Puerto Rico
- Known for: Muralist, Painter, Draftsman
- Patrons: Puerto Rico Iron Works; Capitol of Puerto Rico; Ponce YMCA; Instituto de Cultura Puertorriqueña

Rafael Ríos Rey (28 July 1911 – April 1980) was a Puerto Rican muralist. He is credited with being the first Puerto Rican muralist whose work received international recognition.

== Early years ==
Ríos Rey was born in Ponce, Puerto Rico, on 28 July 1911 in a family of artists. His father was Octavio Ríos De Jesús (1886–1933) who was a scenographer for Russian dancer Anna Pavlova from 1918 to 1921. Ríos Rey studied art under Miguel Pou with such other disciples as Olga Albizu, Horacio Castaign, and Luis Quero Chiesa.

== Career ==
In 1934 Rios Rey studied mural painting under the migrant Spanish mural artist Ismael D'Alzina. In 1936 Rios Rey traveled to New York City where he was exposed to the American muralist movement and the main expositors of Mexican muralism such as Rufino Tamayo, José Clemente Orozco and David Alfaro Sequeiros. He returned to Puerto Rico in 1937 where he established his painting studio. In 1950, Rios Rey traveled to Mexico where he studied metal engraving with Carlos Alvarado Lang, scenography with Antonio López Mancera, mosaic with Jorge Best Benganzo and mural painting with José Chávez Morado.

== Style and characteristics ==
Ríos Rey works the subject of the farm worker, the landscape of the island of Puerto Rico and the many industries and infrastructure building projects that embodied the life of the Puerto Rican people in the first half of the twentieth century.

Ríos Rey is the one Puerto Rican muralist that produced the largest number of murals in Puerto Rico – over eighty. His murals can be seen today at the Banco Crédito y Ahorro Ponceño, Cervecería India, Luis Muñoz Marín International Airport, Little Rock School of Medicine, Ponce YMCA Building, and Puerto Rico Iron Works, in addition to many private residential locations.

He also designed theatrical and operatic scenes in Puerto Rico and New York City. He painted numerous murals for hotels, banks, and public buildings. In addition he did art work for books. His works embodied the life of the poor jibaro countrymen on one end and the industrialization that took place in Puerto Rico in the 1950s at the other end.

== Murals ==
Outstanding murals by Rios Rey are:

- Tradiciones ponceñas. [Ponce Traditions] (1953) at Plaza del Caribe, Ponce
- La Fundición. [The Foundry] (1953) at Empresas Ferre. (Now housing Trinity College of Puerto Rico), Barrio Playa, Ponce.
- El Hombre. [Man] (1955) at the Ponce YMCA Building, Ponce.

There are also several Ríos Rey murals in the first floor of the Banco Crédito y Ahorro Ponceño building (today, 2019, it is called Banco Santander), and at the "Mural de la Música" at the former Parque de Bombas on the southeast corner of Calle Cristina and Calle Mayor (now, 2019, Instituto de Música Juan Morel Campos).

== Last years and death ==
Rios Rey died in San Juan, Puerto Rico on 29 April 1980.

== Honors and legacy ==
- University professor Néstor Murray Irizarry, wrote a biography of Rios Rey in 2001 titled Rafael Ríos Rey: ensayo de ensayo. It was published on the 90th anniversary of the birth or Rafael Rios Rey (2001).

== See also ==
- List of people from Ponce, Puerto Rico
