= Wichie Torres =

Puerto Rican painter (1952–2020)

- Born: Luis Noel Torres Cubillé; 29 March 1952; Ponce, Puerto Rico
- Died: 7 February 2020 (aged 67); San Juan, Puerto Rico
- Education: Pontifical Catholic University of Puerto Rico; Academy of San Carlos
- Known for: Painting
- Notable work: El Flamboyan
- Movement: Costumbrismo
- Patrons: Museo de Arte de Ponce, Puerto Rico Museum of Contemporary Art, Puerto Rico Museum of Art

Wichie Torres (29 March 1952 – 7 February 2020) was a Puerto Rican oil canvas painter. He was an exponent of the costumbrismo movement. He is also the first person in the Central America and Caribbean region to have ever undergone two independent heart transplant operations and have survived both.

== Early years ==
Luis Noel Torres Cubillé, alias Wichie Torres, was born in barrio San Antón, Ponce, Puerto Rico, on 29 March 1952. Early on he showed an inclination for art and Puerto Rican customs and traditions which he started to capture in his adolescence via drawings and paintings. In his early years he studied painting under Carola Colón Coavas.

== Schooling ==
In 1967 he continued his training with Frank Cervoni at the Escuela de Artes Plásticas (School of Plastic Arts) of the Instituto de Cultura Puertorriqueña, in San Juan, Puerto Rico. In 1969 he attended the Universidad Católica de Puerto Rico where he completed his bachelor's degree. He then studied in New York City under Rafael López Sustachí. In 1973 he traveled to Mexico to attend school at the Academia de Arte de San Carlos.

== Career work ==
After completing his training in Mexico, Torres returned to Puerto Rico where his fame grew quickly. His studio was located at 92 Comercio Street (PR-133) in the Ponce Historic Zone. As of 2010, Torres had made over 400 expositions and won over 250 awards.

== Personal life ==
In 1992, at age 40, Torres was told he needed an urgent heart transplant as his heart exhibited a viral condition. He underwent the surgery at the Tampa General Hospital in Tampa, Florida. He recuperated satisfactorily.

After 11 years enjoying good health with his new heart, he was once again told he needed a new heart transplant. As a result, on 5 July 2005 he once again underwent emergency heart transplant surgery, this time at the Centro Cardiovascular de San Juan (San Juan Heart Center) in San Juan, Puerto Rico. He thus became the first person to have two heart transplants in the Caribbean. He once again recuperated satisfactorily.

== Style and characteristics ==
Torres' main themes are people and daily life. He has many paintings inspired by Puerto Rican scenes such as the flamboyan tree, cock-fights, street-side merchants, and the piragüeros. He is best known as a folklore artist, with emphasis on the Afro-Caribbean roots of Puerto Rico. Torres's works have been exhibited in many Puerto Rican towns, in North America, and in Europe.

== Accolades ==
Torres has been in the White House, including at dinners with U.S. President Reagan. Today, some of Torres' works can be seen at the Museo de Arte de Ponce, Museum of Contemporary Art in San Juan, at the Museum of History, Anthropology and Art at the University of Puerto Rico's Río Piedras campus and at the Puerto Rico Museum of Art. Torres is also honored at Ponce's Park of the Illustrious Ponce Citizens.

He created some 5,000 paintings, in addition to presenting over 400 expositions in Puerto Rico, the Caribbean, Latin America, the United States and Europe.

== Death ==
Torres died at Hospital Cardiovascular in San Juan, Puerto Rico, on 7 February 2020. He was survived by his siblings Atilano, María de los Ángeles, José Vicente and David Ricardo, his four children (Luis Noel Torres Ortiz, Wichie Torres Wale, Wilma Torres Wale and Héctor Alejandro Santiago Guzmán) and four grandchildren. As of 9 February 2020, burial was scheduled to occur at Cementerio La Piedad. His death was the result of "pre-existing conditions". He died at Hospital Cardiovascular in San Juan.

== See also ==
- List of Puerto Ricans
