= Domingo Cruz =

Puerto Rican musician

Domingo Cruz ("Cocolía")
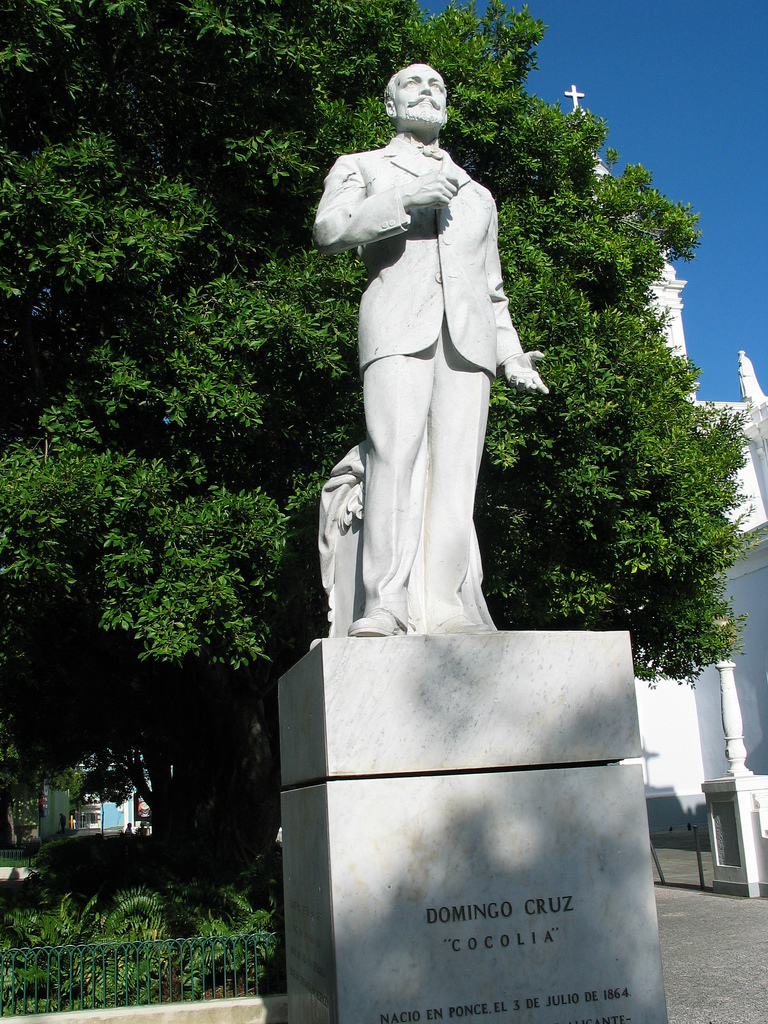
- Domingo Cruz ('Cocolía'), Former director of the Ponce Municipal Band

Background information
- Birth name: Domingo Cruz
- Also known as: Cocolía
- Born: 3 July 1864
- Origin: Ponce, Puerto Rico
- Died: 20 October 1934; Alicante, Spain
- Genres: danza
- Occupation(s): Director of the Ponce Municipal Band, musician

Domingo Cruz (3 July 1864 – 20 October 1934), a.k.a., "Cocolía", was a late 19th-century Puerto Rican musician, and director of the Ponce Firefighters' Band (now the Ponce Municipal Band).

== Early years ==
Domingo Cruz was born in Ponce, Puerto Rico on 3 July 1864.

== Professional career ==
Cocolía (Spanish for little crab) played the saxhorn with "La Lira Ponceña" orchestra (by 1919 also known as the Ponce Symphony Orchestra) under the baton of Ponce's renowned composer Juan Morel Campos. Famous for his danceable tunes, Cocolía was also a music teacher and director of the Firefighters' Band, the Banda Municipal de Ponce. Upon the death of Juan Morel Campos, Cruz became the director of the Ponce Municipal Band. He directed it from 1896 until 1916.

== Death ==
Cocolia died in 1934 in the Province of Alicante, Spain.

== Legacy ==
The city of Ponce recognized his work with a statue. For many years, Cocolia's statue stood in front of the Instituto de Musica Juan Morel Campos, which took over the space previously occupied by the downtown Ponce fire station, next to Teatro La Perla. It currently (2012) stands at Plaza Las Delicias.

Cocolia is also recognized at the Park for the Illustrious Ponce Citizens.

In Ponce, there is also a park named after him at the intersection of Calle Intendente Ramirez, Calle Mayor, and Calle Tricoche streets.

== See also ==
- Juan Morel Campos
- Julio Alvarado Tricoche
- Luis Osvaldo Pino Valdivieso
- List of Puerto Ricans
- People from Ponce, Puerto Rico
- Escuela Libre de Música de Ponce
