= Ponce Municipal Band =

Founded in September 1883 in Ponce, Puerto Rico

Coordinates: 18°0′39.132″N 66°36′50.1474″W

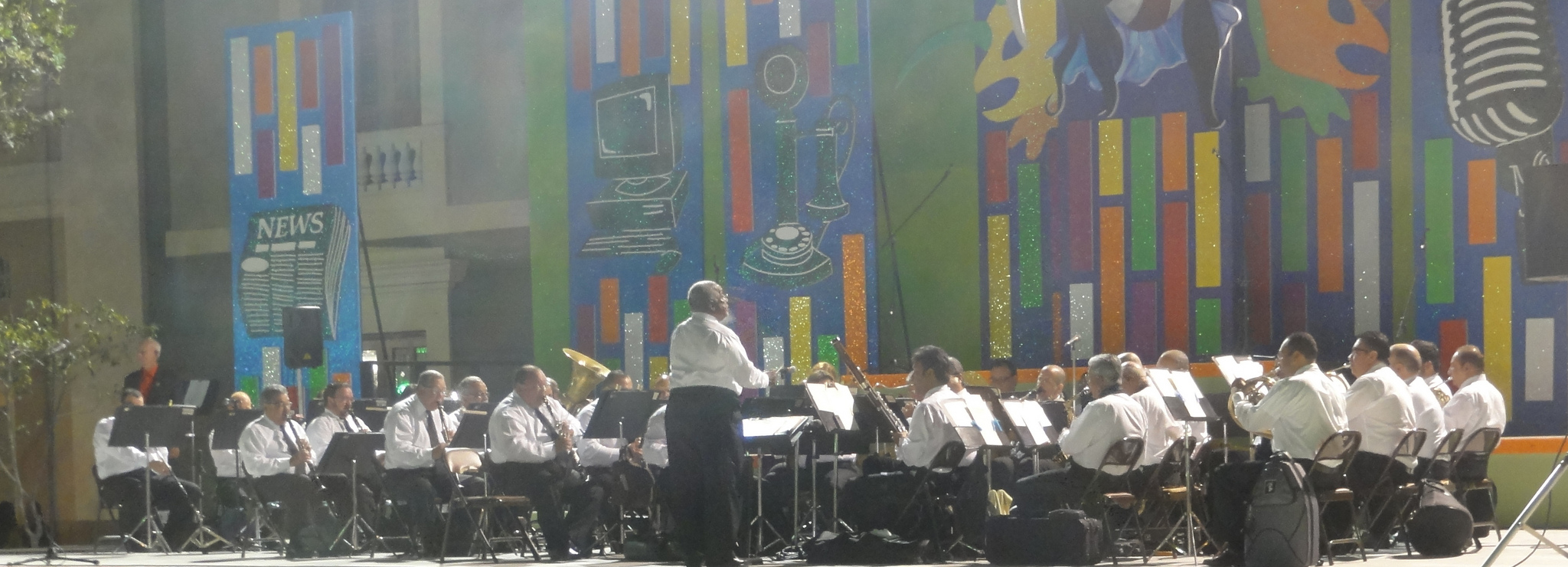
- Banda Municipal de Ponce

Background information
- Origin: Ponce, Puerto Rico
- Genres: Danza, classical
- Occupation: Band
- Years active: 1883-present
- Members: Music Director; Juan García Germaín Founder; Juan Morel Campos Past Directors; Domingo Cruz "Cocolia"; Julio Alvarado Tricoche; Luis Osvaldo Pino Valdivieso; Rubén Colón Tarrats
- Past members: Juan Ríos Ovalle; Other past directors Emilio Alvarado; Eduardo Cuevas; Tomás Clavel; Eustaquio Pujals

The Ponce Municipal Band (Spanish: Banda Municipal de Ponce), also known as Centenaria Banda Municipal de Ponce, is the band of the municipality of Ponce, Puerto Rico. The band is the oldest continuously performing band in the Caribbean and the oldest music group in Puerto Rico. It has performed its open-air concerts for over 125 years. The current director is Juan García Germaín. It has 42 members between 25 and 83 years old. It operates within the jurisdiction of the Oficina de Desarrollo Cultural (English: Office of Cultural Development) of the autonomous municipality of Ponce. Its headquarters are located at the Centro Integrado para el Fortalecimiento de las Artes Musicales, next to Teatro La Perla.

== History ==
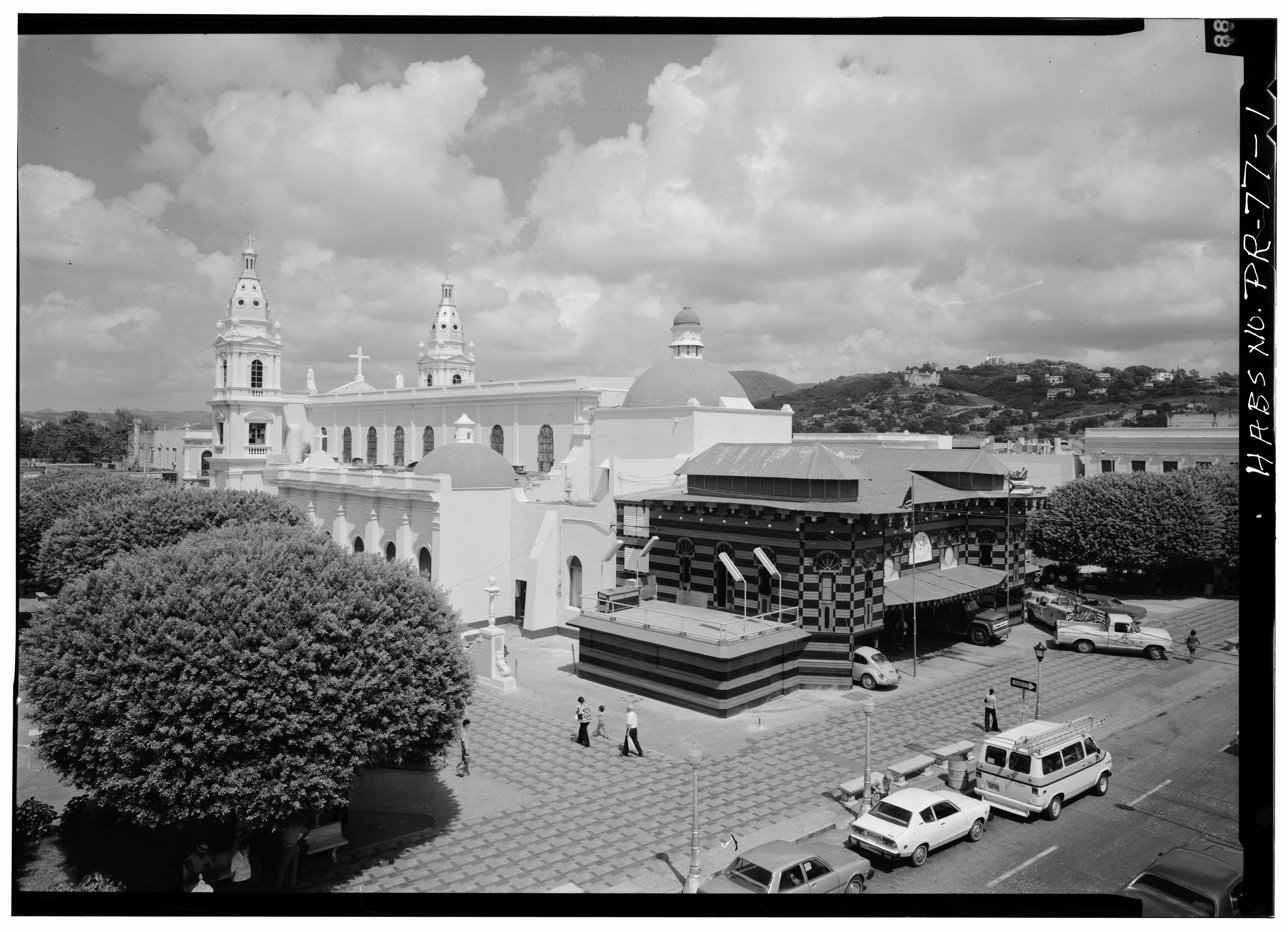
Image showing the platform on the south side of Parque de Bombas where the Banda presented its concerts during the 1960s.

The history of the Ponce Municipal Band dates to its predecessor, the Ponce Firefighters' Band, a band that was already operational in 1859. It was founded in September, 1883, by Juan Morel Campos. In 1953, the Band reorganized and was moved from an organization under the Ponce Firefighters Corps to an organization under the Ponce Municipal Government. The directors of the band after its founder have been Domingo Cruz (Cocolia), Julio Alvarado, Emilio Alvarado, Eduardo Cuevas, Tomás Clavel, and Eustaquio Pujals. The current director is Juan B. García Germaín. Band master Julio Alvarado was the director of the band at the time of its 1953 reorganization. Gregorio Ledesma was the band conductor in 1859.

In late 2010, the Ponce Municipal Government provided the Band its own location for its rehearsals. The new location is next to the legendary Teatro La Perla at a structure named Centro Integrado para el Fortalecimiento de las Artes Musicales (Integrated Center for the Development of the Musical Arts).

== Concerts ==
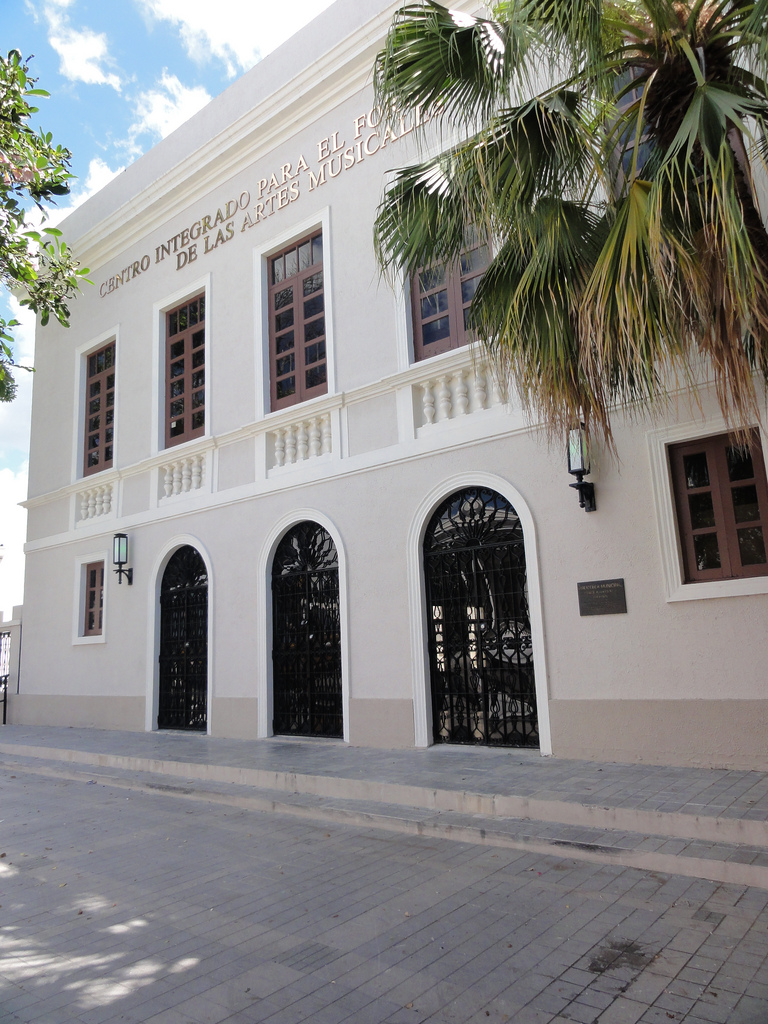
Current (2018) headquarters of the Banda Municipal de Ponce, next to Teatro La Perla in Barrio Tercero, Ponce, Puerto Rico

The Band originally celebrated its concerts from a since-removed second floor stage at Parque de Bombas. It then performed from Paseo Antonio Arias (formerly, Paseo Amor), and has also performed from Concha Acústica de Ponce and Paseo Tablado La Guancha. It also performed from the Dora Colón Clavell Urban Park for some time, and it is currently performing from a removable stage at front of the Ponce City Hall. Concerts are every Sunday evening. In September, 2011, the Band adopted a new venue philosophy called Retretas en la Comunidad, whereby it started to bring its stage to the various communities of Ponce.

== Directors and their terms ==
As "Banda del Benemérito Cuerpo de Bomberos de Ponce":

- Juan Morel Campos (1883–1886)–(1893–1896)
- Eduardo Cuevas (1896? - 1900?)
- Domingo Cruz ("Cocolia") (ca.1900–1916)
- Eustaquio Pujals (ca. 1916–1924)
- Tomás Clavell (ca. 1924 - 1928)

As "Banda Municipal de Ponce":

- Julio Alvarado (1929-1953?)
- Julio Alvarado Tricoche (1953–1970)
- Emilio Alvarado (1970 - 1978?)
- Luis Osvaldo Pino Valdivieso (1978–2001)
- Jorge Figueroa (2001 - 2003?)
- Rubén Colón Tarrats (2003 - 2013)
- Juan García Germaín - (2014 - Incumbent.)

== Current members ==
As of March 2011, the Ponce Municipal Band had 42 members as follows:

- Flute
  - Carlos Torres, Marines Aviles, Jose Rentas
- Clarinet
  - Ada I. Rodriguez, Ricardo Velazquez, Julio Alvarado, Ramon Galindo, Juan Garcia, Estrella Cruz, Feliz Varela, Hector Lopez de Victoria, Cynthia Rodriguez, Nilda Cruz, Guillermo Silvagnoli, Edanette Tirado
- Saxophone
  - Leslie Pagan, Moises Ortiz, Jorge L. Torres, Jose P. Santiago, Jose R. Santiago
- Bassoon
  - Jesus Acevedo
- Trumpet
  - Jose M. Ruiz, Jose Quiñones, Victor Caquias, Edgardo Ruiz, Elder Arroyo, Victor Rodriguez
- Horn
  - Hector I. Maldonado, Felipe Gonzalez, Rohel Ortiz, Orlando Zayas
- Trombone
  - David Perez, Israel Negron, Irving Gonzalez
- Euphonium
  - Angel Santos, Lester Perez Cancel
- Tuba
  - Lester Perez Flores, Arnaldo Tarrio
- Percussion
  - Dimas Rodriguez, Luis M. Valentin, Sergio Gonzalez, Jose Alvarado
