= Instituto de Música Juan Morel Campos =

Musical arts school in Ponce, Puerto Rico

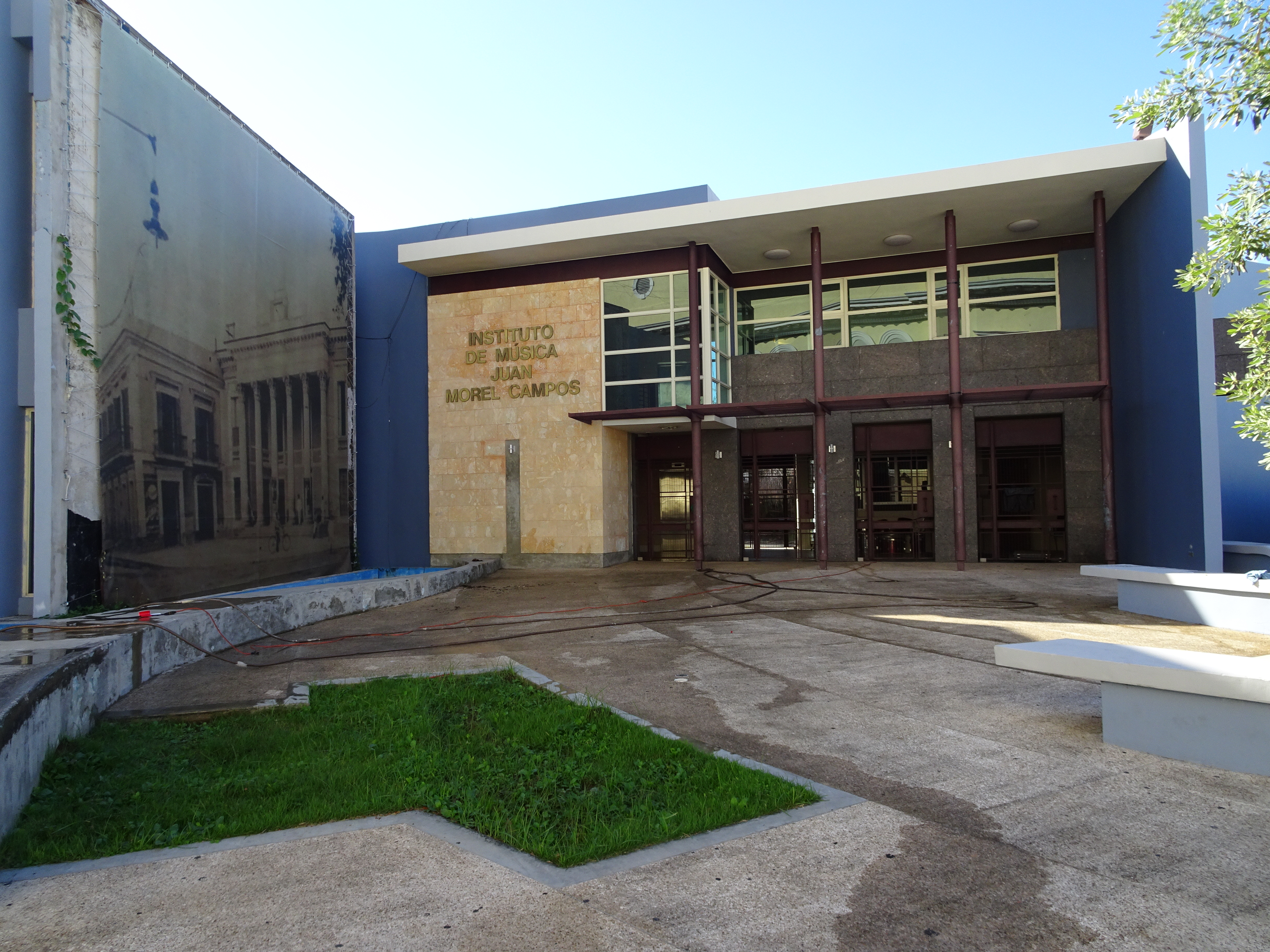
- Front facade view of the Instituto de Música Juan Morel Campos in Ponce, Puerto Rico

Location
- Calle Salud and Cristina and Calle Mayor and Cristina; Ponce, Puerto Rico 00731

Information
- School type: Specialized musical arts school
- Established: 1947; 79 years ago
- Principal: Wilfredo Colon Maldonado (Academic Director)
- Faculty: 29
- Grades: 4–12
- Enrollment: 300+ (2017)
- Language: Spanish
- Area: Ponce Historic Zone
- Website: Instituto de Música Juan Morel Campos

Instituto de Música Juan Morel Campos (English: Juan Morel Campos Music Institute), formerly known as Escuela Libre de Música de Ponce (English: Ponce Free School of Music), is a musical arts institution in Ponce, Puerto Rico. It is an institution of the Ponce Municipal Government. Its first director was Librado Net Pérez. The building had been the former location of the Ponce regional headquarters of Bomberos de Puerto Rico (Puerto Rico Firefighters).

== History ==
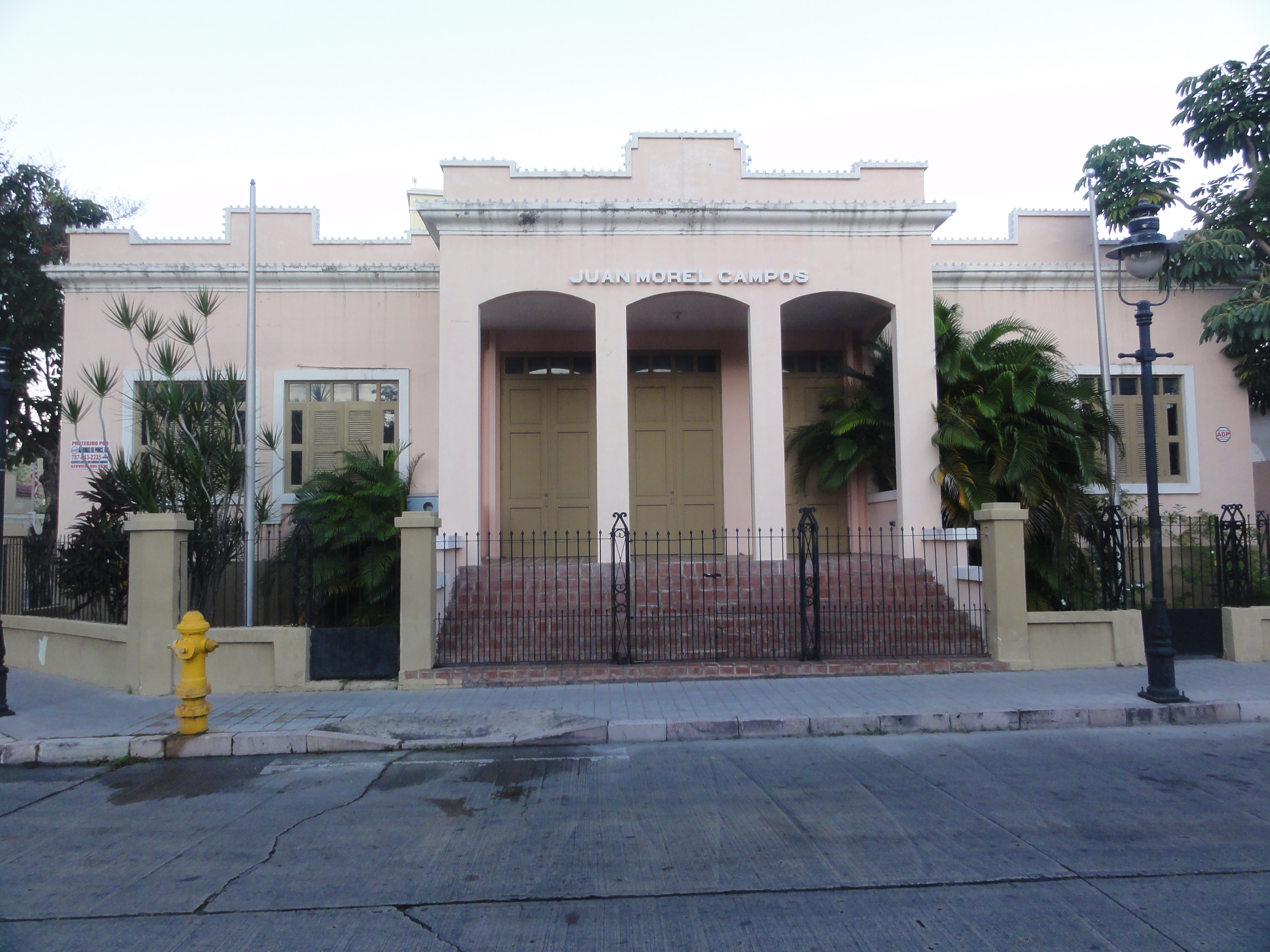
Front facade view of the former site of the Instituto de Música Juan Morel Campos in Ponce, Puerto Rico

The school was founded in 1947 under the municipal administration of Mayor Andrés Grillasca Salas as the Escuela Libre de Música de Ponce (Ponce Free School of Music).

The school's first location was at the structure previously occupied by the Liceo de Ponce (Liceo Ponceño), an early 20th-century girls-only school on the northwest corner of Salud and Cristina streets.

In 1977 the name Escuela Libre de Música de Ponce was changed to Escuela Libre de Música Juan Morel Campos, after the Ponce composer and conductor. In 1980, the Institute was officially reorganized under mayor Jose Guillermo Tormos Vega as an entity of the Municipal Government. Enrollment growth and increased school offerings resulted in the school expanding its headquarters. In 2008, the school expanded again by acquiring a new site on the corner of Calle Cristina and Calle Mayor streets, opposite to Teatro La Perla. The new site included additional classrooms, new administrative offices and an amphitheater. Ponce Municipal decree #40 (2012-2013) renamed the institution to Instituto de Música Juan Morel Campos.

== Construction and appearance ==
The Institute's first structure, on the northwest corner of Cristina and Salud streets, was built in the Art Deco style. The new building on the southwest corner of Cristina and Mayor streets is a former fire station, which was built in recto-linear fashion following modern architectural style. The front yard of the Institute at Calle Cristina contains the only olive tree planted in Puerto Rico. The building as originally built was not only a fire station but also the former location of the Ponce regional headquarters of the Bomberos de Puerto Rico.

A mosaic mural titled "La Abnegacion" (Selflessness) by Rafael Ríos Rey (now [2023] in ruins] commemorates the building's former use as a fire station. The mural was built in 1960.

== Organizations ==
The Institute has several musical organizations. Among them are Coro de Niños (Children's Choir) and Coro Juvenil (Youth Choir), both in the past directed by music professor María Asunción Ondarra Fombellida, are now under the direction of professor Bianca Alvarado. It also has a Conjunto de Tiples (Treble Ensemble), led by professor Héctor Hernández. There is also a Conjunto de Cuerdas Punteadas (Plucked Strings Ensemble). In addition there are an Orquesta Sinfonica Juvenil (Youth Symphony Orchestra), Banda Juvenil (Youth Band), Conjunto de Metales (Metal Ensemble), Conjunto de Cañas (Reeds Ensemble), Conjunto de Percusión (Percussion Ensemble), and Conjunto de Acordeones (Accordion Ensemble).

== Accolades ==
Its symphony orchestra received a Senate Resolution from the Puerto Rico Senate in 2010.

== Notable alumni ==
- Yovianna Garcia
- Héctor Lavoe
- José (Cheo) Feliciano
- Papo Lucca

== See also ==
- List of high schools in Puerto Rico
