= Juan Morel Campos =

Puerto Rican composer (1857–1896)

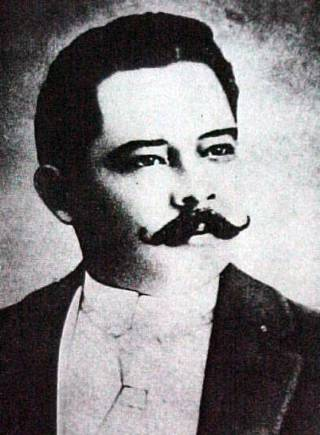
- Juan Morel Campos, Founder of the Ponce Municipal Band

Background information
- Born: 16 May 1857
- Origin: Ponce, Puerto Rico
- Died: 12 May 1896 (aged 38) Ponce, Puerto Rico
- Genres: danza
- Occupations: Composer, Founder of the Ponce Municipal Band

Juan Morel Campos (16 May 1857 – 12 May 1896), sometimes spelled Juan Morell Campos, was a Puerto Rican composer, considered by many to be responsible for taking the genre of danza to its highest level. He composed over 550 musical works before he died unexpectedly at age 38.

== Early years ==
Morel Campos (full name: Juan Nepomuceno Morel Campos) was born in Ponce, Puerto Rico, to Manuel Morel Araujo, from the Dominican Republic, and Juana de Dios Campos Collazo, from Venezuela. He began to study music at the young age of eight in his hometown under the guidance of Antonio Egipciaco. Morel Campos was a student of Puerto Rican composer and pianist Gonzalo de J. Núñez (1850 - 1915), whose students also included the internationally known musicians and composers Manuel Gregorio Tavárez and Arístides Chavier Arévalo. Morel Campos learned to play practically every brass instrument and eventually became one of the founders and directors of the "Ponce Firemen's Band" (La Banda de Bomberos del Parque de Bombas de Ponce). The legendary band was later renamed the Ponce Municipal Band.

== First composition ==
Later, Morel Campos became a student of the composer Manuel Gregorio Tavárez, "The Father of the Danza". Campos' first danza composition was called "Sopapos". The influence of Tavárez, plus the particular style developed by Morel Campos can be listened to in his music today.

Morel Campos had his own dance orchestra, "La Lira Ponceña." Most of his danzas were written for dancing. He modified his compositions so that they may also be played on piano. Morel Campos is best known for his danza compositions, but he also composed waltzes, operas, symphonies, marches and overtures.

Women and the theme of love inspired most of his musical compositions. His great love was a lady named Mercedes Arias, but her family did not approve of their relationship. It was from that frustrated "love" that many of Morel Campos's beautiful danzas were born, with "Maldito amor" (Damned Love) as an example. Among his other best-known compositions were "Felices días" (Happy Days), "No me toques" (Do Not Touch Me), and "Idilio" (Idyll).

== Selection of Danzas by Morel Campos ==
External audio
- You may listen to Luciano Quiñones piano interpretation of Morel Campos's "No me toques" here

The following is a list of some of Morel Campos's Danzas:

- Conversación (Conversation)
- Felices días (Happy Days)
- Laura y Georgina (Laura and Georgina)
- Idilio (Idyll)
- Maldito amor (Damned Love)
- No me toques (Do Not Touch Me)
- Sin ti jamás (Never without you)
- Sí, te toco (Yes, I will touch you)
- Sueño de amor (Dream of love)
- Ten piedad (Have pity)
- Tormento (Torment)
- Un conflicto (A conflict)
- Vano empeño (Trying in vain)

Domingo Cruz "Cocolía" became director of the Firefighters' Band upon the untimely death of Morel Campos.

== Later years ==
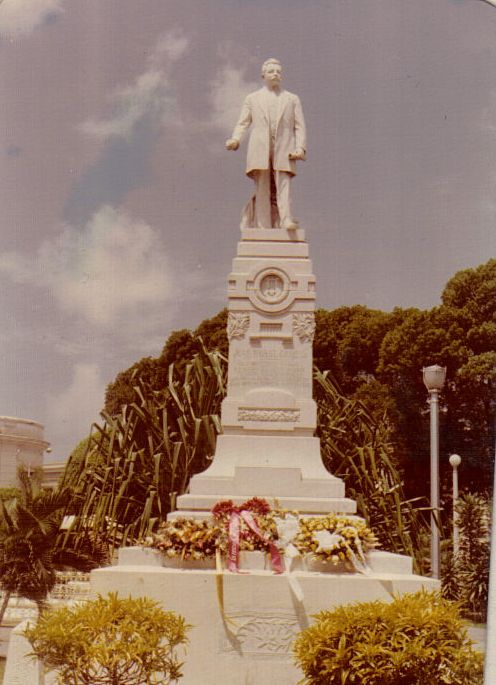
Statue of Juan Morel Campos at Plaza Las Delicias in Ponce

Juan Morel Campos suffered a stroke on 26 April 1896 during a concert in Ponce. He died of the stroke soon thereafter on 16 May, in Ponce. In December 1926, his remains were buried on the pedestal of his statue in Plaza Las Delicias. His wife was Secundina Beltrán Collazo. Their children were Olimpia, Eugenia, Belén, Plácido, and Manuel.

== Legacy ==
- Schools named after him:
  - The Free School of Music Juan Morel Campos in Ponce.
  - The Juan Morel Campos School of the Arts in Brooklyn, New York.
  - The Juan Morel Campos Elementary School (Calle Leon Final) in Ponce.
  - The Juan Morel Campos in Bayamon, Puerto Rico.
- The Juan Morel Campos statue was erected in the Plaza Las Delicias in Ponce.
- A housing development in Barrio Segundo, Ponce, is named for him.
- In 1984, the Government of Puerto Rico declared 16 May to be celebrated annually as "Juan Morel Campos Day" and 23 November be known as "The Day of the Composer".
- In 2001, Morel Campos was posthumously inducted into the International Latin Music Hall of Fame.
- His nephew Pedro Albizu Campos became a noted leader of the Puerto Rican Nationalist Party.
- Morel Campos is commemorated at the Ponce Park of the Illustrious Ponce Citizens.

== See also ==
- List of Puerto Ricans
- List of composers by nationality
- List of Puerto Rican songwriters
- Juan Morel Campos (statue)
