= Parque del Tricentenario (Ponce, Puerto Rico) =

Passive urban park in Ponce, Puerto Rico

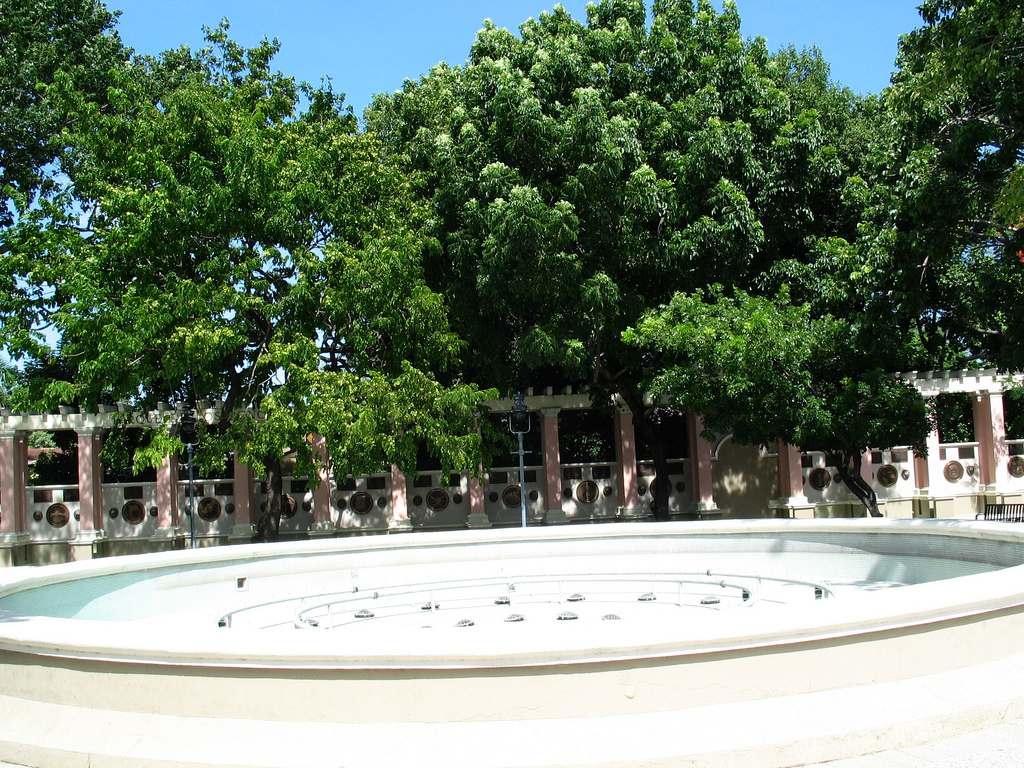
- The Illustrious Ponce Citizens Plaza at Tricentennial Park in Ponce, looking West
- Interactive map of Parque del Tricentenario
- Type: Urban park
- Location: Ponce, Puerto Rico
- Coordinates: 18°00′44.79″N 66°36′29.36″W
- Created: 1992
- Designer: Juan Dalmau, architect
- Operator: Government of the Municipality of Ponce, Puerto Rico
- Status: Open dawn to dusk, every day. Entrance free.

Parque del Tricentenario is a passive urban park in the city of Ponce, Puerto Rico. The park was built to commemorate the 300th anniversary of the founding of the city. It was inaugurated during the mayoral administration of mayor Rafael Cordero Santiago.

== Location ==
The park is a passive urban family park. It is located in Barrio Tercero at the entrance to the Ponce Historic Zone on Miguel Pou Boulevard, at the southern terminus of PR-1.

== Features ==
The park is a three-plaza park. All three plazas have gardens and marble benches. Setting the stage for the park is El Puente de los Leones (The Bridge of the Lions). It spans Rio Portugues and is the gateway to, not just Parque del Tricentenario, but to the Ponce historical district as well. It features two brass lions guarding the entrance: the older lion represents wisdom and experience, while the younger one stands for the glorious future.

=== The Illustrious Ponce Citizens Plaza ===
Its centerpiece is a plaza containing a fountain dedicated to Ponce's most illustrious citizens. This plaza is known as Parque de los Ponceños Ilustres (the Illustrious Ponce Citizens Plaza). At either side of this plaza, and tucked in somewhat but facing side streets that lead to and return from the center of the city, are two separate areas dedicated to two of the most honored citizens of Ponce. The one on the right is dedicated to governor Rafael Hernandez Colon; the one on the left is dedicated to governor Luis A. Ferre. A large wall near Hernandez Colon's right plazalette has the encryption, "Ponce es del que nos visita. Ponce es nuestro" (Ponce belongs to those who visit us. Ponce is ours).

The middle area is the largest area of this plaza. It contains a very large fountain and behind the fountain are 24 "kiosks" with fountainettes. Sixteen of these fountainette kiosks are dedicated to illustrious Ponce citizens in 16 different areas of endeavor. Moving from left to right, these twelve areas are: History, Politics, Journalism, Writing, Architecture, Citizenship, Medicine, Music, Craftsmanship, Education, Sports, Plastic Arts, Law, Business, Ponceñistas, and Theatrical Arts. Each fountainette kiosk then has one or more plaques with the names or those being honored engraved on them. Every few years the municipal government announces that new names are to be added to the list and petitions its citizens for suggestions.

=== The Francisco Porrata Doria Plaza ===
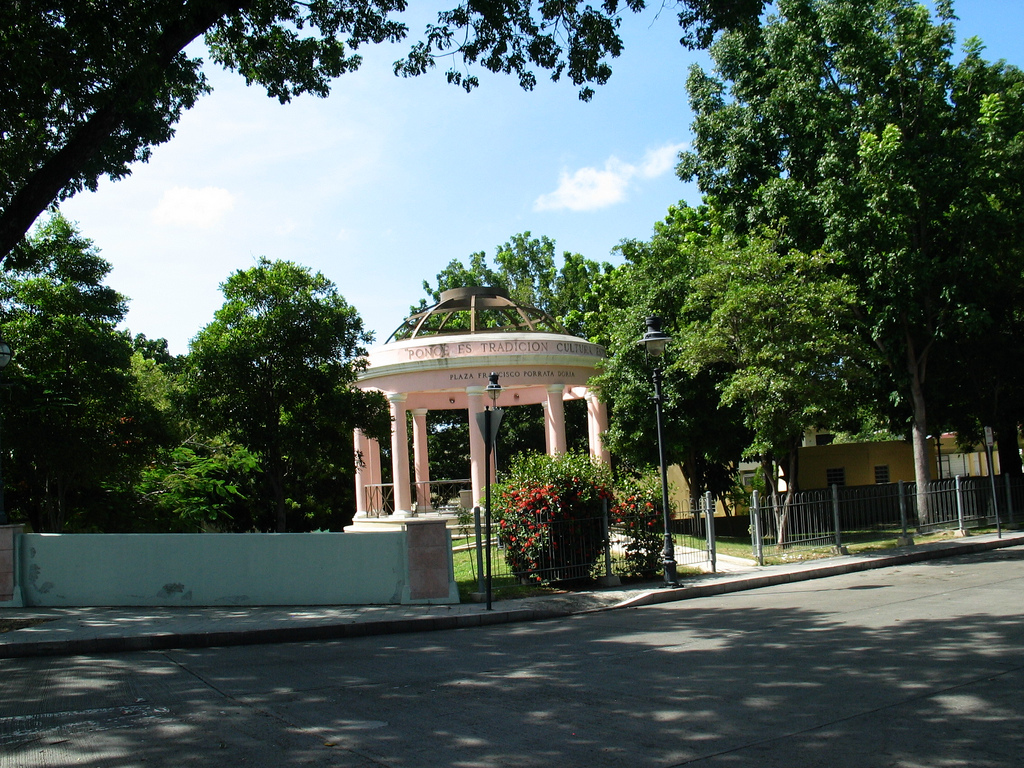
Plaza Francisco Porrata-Doria, looking southeast

The second major plaza, called the Plaza de la Arquitectura Francisco Porrata Doria (Francisco Porrata Doria Architecture Plaza), features a rotunda and honors the city's architecture. On the rotunda's outer crown is the following encryption: "Ponce es Tradicion, Cultura, Espiritu, Civismo, Ilusion. Ponce es Virtud." ("Ponce is Tradition, Culture, Spirit, Civism, Ilusion. Ponce is Virtue.") The same rotunda has another encryption on its floor that reads: "Estabilidad, Durabilidad, Conveniencia, Belleza, Firmeza." ("Estability, Durability, Convenience, Beauty, Resolution.") To the right of this plaza is the bust of governor Roberto Sanchez Vilella who, though not born in Ponce, did lived there during his formative school years, and is considered an adopted son of the city.

=== The Latin American Statesmen Plaza ===
The third major plaza honors Latin American statesmen and it is called Plaza de los Próceres Latinoamericanos (Latin-American Statesmen Plaza). This third plaza is dedicated to Simón Bolívar, Juan Pablo Duarte, José Martí, and Luis Muñoz Marín, and there are statues of these prominent people there.

== History ==
The park was inaugurated in 1992 under the administration of mayor Rafael Cordero Santiago.

== Symbolisms ==
The entrance of the park, via Puente de Los Leones, is guarded by two massive pillars each topped by a lion - one the symbol of knowledge, the other the symbol of power.
